

95001–95100 

|-bgcolor=#fefefe
| 95001 ||  || — || December 17, 2001 || Palomar || NEAT || V || align=right | 1.4 km || 
|-id=002 bgcolor=#E9E9E9
| 95002 ||  || — || December 17, 2001 || Socorro || LINEAR || — || align=right | 2.3 km || 
|-id=003 bgcolor=#E9E9E9
| 95003 ||  || — || December 19, 2001 || Palomar || NEAT || — || align=right | 4.1 km || 
|-id=004 bgcolor=#fefefe
| 95004 ||  || — || December 19, 2001 || Palomar || NEAT || — || align=right | 1.6 km || 
|-id=005 bgcolor=#fefefe
| 95005 ||  || — || December 20, 2001 || Palomar || NEAT || — || align=right | 2.3 km || 
|-id=006 bgcolor=#fefefe
| 95006 || 2002 AQ || — || January 5, 2002 || Oizumi || T. Kobayashi || — || align=right | 1.5 km || 
|-id=007 bgcolor=#fefefe
| 95007 || 2002 AR || — || January 5, 2002 || Oizumi || T. Kobayashi || NYS || align=right | 1.7 km || 
|-id=008 bgcolor=#fefefe
| 95008 Ivanobertini ||  ||  || January 4, 2002 || Cima Ekar || ADAS || — || align=right | 1.5 km || 
|-id=009 bgcolor=#fefefe
| 95009 ||  || — || January 4, 2002 || Cima Ekar || ADAS || — || align=right | 2.2 km || 
|-id=010 bgcolor=#fefefe
| 95010 ||  || — || January 6, 2002 || Oizumi || T. Kobayashi || MAS || align=right | 1.8 km || 
|-id=011 bgcolor=#fefefe
| 95011 ||  || — || January 6, 2002 || Oizumi || T. Kobayashi || — || align=right | 1.9 km || 
|-id=012 bgcolor=#fefefe
| 95012 ||  || — || January 6, 2002 || Oizumi || T. Kobayashi || NYS || align=right | 1.3 km || 
|-id=013 bgcolor=#fefefe
| 95013 ||  || — || January 6, 2002 || Oizumi || T. Kobayashi || MAS || align=right | 2.2 km || 
|-id=014 bgcolor=#fefefe
| 95014 ||  || — || January 4, 2002 || Needville || Needville Obs. || — || align=right | 1.9 km || 
|-id=015 bgcolor=#fefefe
| 95015 ||  || — || January 8, 2002 || Oizumi || T. Kobayashi || — || align=right | 2.1 km || 
|-id=016 bgcolor=#E9E9E9
| 95016 Kimjeongho ||  ||  || January 9, 2002 || Bohyunsan || Y.-B. Jeon || HEN || align=right | 1.8 km || 
|-id=017 bgcolor=#fefefe
| 95017 ||  || — || January 11, 2002 || Desert Eagle || W. K. Y. Yeung || NYS || align=right | 1.6 km || 
|-id=018 bgcolor=#fefefe
| 95018 ||  || — || January 11, 2002 || Desert Eagle || W. K. Y. Yeung || CHL || align=right | 5.3 km || 
|-id=019 bgcolor=#fefefe
| 95019 ||  || — || January 5, 2002 || Haleakala || NEAT || V || align=right | 1.5 km || 
|-id=020 bgcolor=#E9E9E9
| 95020 Nencini ||  ||  || January 10, 2002 || Campo Imperatore || F. Bernardi || — || align=right | 2.3 km || 
|-id=021 bgcolor=#fefefe
| 95021 ||  || — || January 12, 2002 || Desert Eagle || W. K. Y. Yeung || — || align=right | 3.2 km || 
|-id=022 bgcolor=#E9E9E9
| 95022 ||  || — || January 12, 2002 || Desert Eagle || W. K. Y. Yeung || — || align=right | 3.0 km || 
|-id=023 bgcolor=#fefefe
| 95023 ||  || — || January 4, 2002 || Haleakala || NEAT || FLO || align=right | 1.7 km || 
|-id=024 bgcolor=#fefefe
| 95024 Ericaellingson ||  ||  || January 8, 2002 || Cima Ekar || ADAS || — || align=right | 2.2 km || 
|-id=025 bgcolor=#fefefe
| 95025 ||  || — || January 7, 2002 || Palomar || NEAT || NYS || align=right | 1.0 km || 
|-id=026 bgcolor=#fefefe
| 95026 ||  || — || January 8, 2002 || Socorro || LINEAR || — || align=right | 1.4 km || 
|-id=027 bgcolor=#fefefe
| 95027 ||  || — || January 5, 2002 || Haleakala || NEAT || — || align=right | 1.8 km || 
|-id=028 bgcolor=#fefefe
| 95028 ||  || — || January 7, 2002 || Palomar || NEAT || NYS || align=right | 3.3 km || 
|-id=029 bgcolor=#fefefe
| 95029 ||  || — || January 7, 2002 || Palomar || NEAT || NYS || align=right | 1.2 km || 
|-id=030 bgcolor=#E9E9E9
| 95030 ||  || — || January 8, 2002 || Palomar || NEAT || ADE || align=right | 4.7 km || 
|-id=031 bgcolor=#fefefe
| 95031 ||  || — || January 13, 2002 || Majorca || J. Nomen || NYS || align=right | 4.7 km || 
|-id=032 bgcolor=#fefefe
| 95032 ||  || — || January 9, 2002 || Haleakala || NEAT || FLO || align=right | 1.8 km || 
|-id=033 bgcolor=#E9E9E9
| 95033 ||  || — || January 12, 2002 || Goodricke-Pigott || R. A. Tucker || — || align=right | 4.7 km || 
|-id=034 bgcolor=#E9E9E9
| 95034 ||  || — || January 14, 2002 || Desert Eagle || W. K. Y. Yeung || — || align=right | 3.9 km || 
|-id=035 bgcolor=#fefefe
| 95035 ||  || — || January 14, 2002 || Desert Eagle || W. K. Y. Yeung || — || align=right | 2.0 km || 
|-id=036 bgcolor=#fefefe
| 95036 ||  || — || January 14, 2002 || Desert Eagle || W. K. Y. Yeung || — || align=right | 2.1 km || 
|-id=037 bgcolor=#E9E9E9
| 95037 ||  || — || January 14, 2002 || Desert Eagle || W. K. Y. Yeung || EUN || align=right | 2.4 km || 
|-id=038 bgcolor=#E9E9E9
| 95038 ||  || — || January 5, 2002 || Anderson Mesa || LONEOS || — || align=right | 3.4 km || 
|-id=039 bgcolor=#fefefe
| 95039 ||  || — || January 5, 2002 || Anderson Mesa || LONEOS || — || align=right | 1.4 km || 
|-id=040 bgcolor=#fefefe
| 95040 ||  || — || January 7, 2002 || Anderson Mesa || LONEOS || NYS || align=right | 1.6 km || 
|-id=041 bgcolor=#fefefe
| 95041 ||  || — || January 9, 2002 || Socorro || LINEAR || — || align=right | 2.1 km || 
|-id=042 bgcolor=#fefefe
| 95042 ||  || — || January 9, 2002 || Socorro || LINEAR || — || align=right | 2.2 km || 
|-id=043 bgcolor=#E9E9E9
| 95043 ||  || — || January 12, 2002 || Kitt Peak || Spacewatch || — || align=right | 1.7 km || 
|-id=044 bgcolor=#fefefe
| 95044 ||  || — || January 8, 2002 || Socorro || LINEAR || V || align=right | 1.1 km || 
|-id=045 bgcolor=#fefefe
| 95045 ||  || — || January 9, 2002 || Socorro || LINEAR || — || align=right | 1.9 km || 
|-id=046 bgcolor=#E9E9E9
| 95046 ||  || — || January 9, 2002 || Socorro || LINEAR || — || align=right | 2.6 km || 
|-id=047 bgcolor=#E9E9E9
| 95047 ||  || — || January 9, 2002 || Socorro || LINEAR || — || align=right | 3.7 km || 
|-id=048 bgcolor=#E9E9E9
| 95048 ||  || — || January 9, 2002 || Socorro || LINEAR || — || align=right | 1.7 km || 
|-id=049 bgcolor=#E9E9E9
| 95049 ||  || — || January 9, 2002 || Socorro || LINEAR || — || align=right | 4.1 km || 
|-id=050 bgcolor=#fefefe
| 95050 ||  || — || January 9, 2002 || Socorro || LINEAR || V || align=right | 1.3 km || 
|-id=051 bgcolor=#E9E9E9
| 95051 ||  || — || January 9, 2002 || Socorro || LINEAR || — || align=right | 1.6 km || 
|-id=052 bgcolor=#fefefe
| 95052 ||  || — || January 9, 2002 || Socorro || LINEAR || NYS || align=right | 2.5 km || 
|-id=053 bgcolor=#E9E9E9
| 95053 ||  || — || January 9, 2002 || Socorro || LINEAR || — || align=right | 4.2 km || 
|-id=054 bgcolor=#E9E9E9
| 95054 ||  || — || January 9, 2002 || Socorro || LINEAR || — || align=right | 4.4 km || 
|-id=055 bgcolor=#fefefe
| 95055 ||  || — || January 9, 2002 || Socorro || LINEAR || — || align=right | 1.4 km || 
|-id=056 bgcolor=#E9E9E9
| 95056 ||  || — || January 9, 2002 || Socorro || LINEAR || — || align=right | 5.1 km || 
|-id=057 bgcolor=#fefefe
| 95057 ||  || — || January 9, 2002 || Socorro || LINEAR || — || align=right | 2.8 km || 
|-id=058 bgcolor=#d6d6d6
| 95058 ||  || — || January 9, 2002 || Socorro || LINEAR || — || align=right | 5.7 km || 
|-id=059 bgcolor=#E9E9E9
| 95059 ||  || — || January 9, 2002 || Socorro || LINEAR || — || align=right | 5.4 km || 
|-id=060 bgcolor=#E9E9E9
| 95060 ||  || — || January 9, 2002 || Socorro || LINEAR || — || align=right | 2.3 km || 
|-id=061 bgcolor=#E9E9E9
| 95061 ||  || — || January 9, 2002 || Socorro || LINEAR || — || align=right | 3.3 km || 
|-id=062 bgcolor=#E9E9E9
| 95062 ||  || — || January 9, 2002 || Socorro || LINEAR || — || align=right | 3.0 km || 
|-id=063 bgcolor=#fefefe
| 95063 ||  || — || January 11, 2002 || Socorro || LINEAR || NYS || align=right | 2.7 km || 
|-id=064 bgcolor=#fefefe
| 95064 ||  || — || January 11, 2002 || Socorro || LINEAR || MAS || align=right | 1.4 km || 
|-id=065 bgcolor=#E9E9E9
| 95065 ||  || — || January 11, 2002 || Socorro || LINEAR || — || align=right | 2.2 km || 
|-id=066 bgcolor=#fefefe
| 95066 ||  || — || January 11, 2002 || Socorro || LINEAR || — || align=right | 2.5 km || 
|-id=067 bgcolor=#fefefe
| 95067 ||  || — || January 11, 2002 || Socorro || LINEAR || CHL || align=right | 5.5 km || 
|-id=068 bgcolor=#fefefe
| 95068 ||  || — || January 11, 2002 || Socorro || LINEAR || — || align=right | 1.4 km || 
|-id=069 bgcolor=#E9E9E9
| 95069 ||  || — || January 11, 2002 || Socorro || LINEAR || — || align=right | 3.1 km || 
|-id=070 bgcolor=#E9E9E9
| 95070 ||  || — || January 11, 2002 || Socorro || LINEAR || HNS || align=right | 3.7 km || 
|-id=071 bgcolor=#fefefe
| 95071 ||  || — || January 13, 2002 || Socorro || LINEAR || FLO || align=right | 1.1 km || 
|-id=072 bgcolor=#E9E9E9
| 95072 ČVUT ||  ||  || January 15, 2002 || Kleť || M. Tichý || — || align=right | 3.7 km || 
|-id=073 bgcolor=#fefefe
| 95073 ||  || — || January 8, 2002 || Socorro || LINEAR || — || align=right | 2.1 km || 
|-id=074 bgcolor=#fefefe
| 95074 ||  || — || January 8, 2002 || Socorro || LINEAR || CLA || align=right | 4.1 km || 
|-id=075 bgcolor=#fefefe
| 95075 ||  || — || January 8, 2002 || Socorro || LINEAR || NYS || align=right | 1.5 km || 
|-id=076 bgcolor=#fefefe
| 95076 ||  || — || January 8, 2002 || Socorro || LINEAR || — || align=right | 1.8 km || 
|-id=077 bgcolor=#fefefe
| 95077 ||  || — || January 8, 2002 || Socorro || LINEAR || — || align=right | 1.2 km || 
|-id=078 bgcolor=#fefefe
| 95078 ||  || — || January 8, 2002 || Socorro || LINEAR || — || align=right | 1.8 km || 
|-id=079 bgcolor=#fefefe
| 95079 ||  || — || January 8, 2002 || Socorro || LINEAR || — || align=right | 1.3 km || 
|-id=080 bgcolor=#fefefe
| 95080 ||  || — || January 9, 2002 || Socorro || LINEAR || — || align=right | 1.8 km || 
|-id=081 bgcolor=#fefefe
| 95081 ||  || — || January 9, 2002 || Socorro || LINEAR || — || align=right | 1.8 km || 
|-id=082 bgcolor=#fefefe
| 95082 ||  || — || January 9, 2002 || Socorro || LINEAR || — || align=right | 3.1 km || 
|-id=083 bgcolor=#fefefe
| 95083 ||  || — || January 9, 2002 || Socorro || LINEAR || ERI || align=right | 3.5 km || 
|-id=084 bgcolor=#E9E9E9
| 95084 ||  || — || January 9, 2002 || Socorro || LINEAR || — || align=right | 2.6 km || 
|-id=085 bgcolor=#E9E9E9
| 95085 ||  || — || January 9, 2002 || Socorro || LINEAR || — || align=right | 2.3 km || 
|-id=086 bgcolor=#fefefe
| 95086 ||  || — || January 9, 2002 || Socorro || LINEAR || FLO || align=right | 1.6 km || 
|-id=087 bgcolor=#FA8072
| 95087 ||  || — || January 11, 2002 || Socorro || LINEAR || PHO || align=right | 3.2 km || 
|-id=088 bgcolor=#fefefe
| 95088 ||  || — || January 8, 2002 || Socorro || LINEAR || NYS || align=right | 1.1 km || 
|-id=089 bgcolor=#fefefe
| 95089 ||  || — || January 8, 2002 || Socorro || LINEAR || — || align=right | 1.6 km || 
|-id=090 bgcolor=#E9E9E9
| 95090 ||  || — || January 8, 2002 || Socorro || LINEAR || RAF || align=right | 2.3 km || 
|-id=091 bgcolor=#E9E9E9
| 95091 ||  || — || January 8, 2002 || Socorro || LINEAR || — || align=right | 4.5 km || 
|-id=092 bgcolor=#E9E9E9
| 95092 ||  || — || January 8, 2002 || Socorro || LINEAR || — || align=right | 2.1 km || 
|-id=093 bgcolor=#E9E9E9
| 95093 ||  || — || January 8, 2002 || Socorro || LINEAR || — || align=right | 1.8 km || 
|-id=094 bgcolor=#E9E9E9
| 95094 ||  || — || January 8, 2002 || Socorro || LINEAR || — || align=right | 2.9 km || 
|-id=095 bgcolor=#E9E9E9
| 95095 ||  || — || January 9, 2002 || Socorro || LINEAR || — || align=right | 4.3 km || 
|-id=096 bgcolor=#fefefe
| 95096 ||  || — || January 9, 2002 || Socorro || LINEAR || — || align=right | 2.3 km || 
|-id=097 bgcolor=#fefefe
| 95097 ||  || — || January 9, 2002 || Socorro || LINEAR || NYS || align=right | 1.2 km || 
|-id=098 bgcolor=#fefefe
| 95098 ||  || — || January 9, 2002 || Socorro || LINEAR || MAS || align=right | 1.4 km || 
|-id=099 bgcolor=#d6d6d6
| 95099 ||  || — || January 9, 2002 || Socorro || LINEAR || — || align=right | 7.3 km || 
|-id=100 bgcolor=#fefefe
| 95100 ||  || — || January 9, 2002 || Socorro || LINEAR || EUT || align=right | 1.6 km || 
|}

95101–95200 

|-bgcolor=#fefefe
| 95101 ||  || — || January 9, 2002 || Socorro || LINEAR || — || align=right | 1.6 km || 
|-id=102 bgcolor=#fefefe
| 95102 ||  || — || January 9, 2002 || Socorro || LINEAR || — || align=right | 1.4 km || 
|-id=103 bgcolor=#fefefe
| 95103 ||  || — || January 9, 2002 || Socorro || LINEAR || — || align=right | 1.5 km || 
|-id=104 bgcolor=#fefefe
| 95104 ||  || — || January 9, 2002 || Socorro || LINEAR || FLO || align=right | 1.4 km || 
|-id=105 bgcolor=#E9E9E9
| 95105 ||  || — || January 9, 2002 || Socorro || LINEAR || — || align=right | 2.5 km || 
|-id=106 bgcolor=#fefefe
| 95106 ||  || — || January 9, 2002 || Socorro || LINEAR || — || align=right | 2.0 km || 
|-id=107 bgcolor=#fefefe
| 95107 ||  || — || January 9, 2002 || Socorro || LINEAR || — || align=right | 2.5 km || 
|-id=108 bgcolor=#E9E9E9
| 95108 ||  || — || January 9, 2002 || Socorro || LINEAR || — || align=right | 2.1 km || 
|-id=109 bgcolor=#fefefe
| 95109 ||  || — || January 9, 2002 || Socorro || LINEAR || NYS || align=right | 1.3 km || 
|-id=110 bgcolor=#fefefe
| 95110 ||  || — || January 9, 2002 || Socorro || LINEAR || NYS || align=right | 1.6 km || 
|-id=111 bgcolor=#fefefe
| 95111 ||  || — || January 9, 2002 || Socorro || LINEAR || — || align=right | 1.8 km || 
|-id=112 bgcolor=#fefefe
| 95112 ||  || — || January 9, 2002 || Socorro || LINEAR || — || align=right | 1.8 km || 
|-id=113 bgcolor=#d6d6d6
| 95113 ||  || — || January 9, 2002 || Socorro || LINEAR || — || align=right | 5.8 km || 
|-id=114 bgcolor=#E9E9E9
| 95114 ||  || — || January 9, 2002 || Socorro || LINEAR || ADE || align=right | 5.1 km || 
|-id=115 bgcolor=#E9E9E9
| 95115 ||  || — || January 9, 2002 || Socorro || LINEAR || ADE || align=right | 5.4 km || 
|-id=116 bgcolor=#fefefe
| 95116 ||  || — || January 9, 2002 || Socorro || LINEAR || — || align=right | 3.2 km || 
|-id=117 bgcolor=#E9E9E9
| 95117 ||  || — || January 9, 2002 || Socorro || LINEAR || — || align=right | 5.3 km || 
|-id=118 bgcolor=#fefefe
| 95118 ||  || — || January 9, 2002 || Socorro || LINEAR || — || align=right | 1.7 km || 
|-id=119 bgcolor=#fefefe
| 95119 ||  || — || January 11, 2002 || Socorro || LINEAR || — || align=right | 4.3 km || 
|-id=120 bgcolor=#E9E9E9
| 95120 ||  || — || January 13, 2002 || Socorro || LINEAR || GEF || align=right | 3.1 km || 
|-id=121 bgcolor=#E9E9E9
| 95121 ||  || — || January 12, 2002 || Palomar || NEAT || — || align=right | 2.0 km || 
|-id=122 bgcolor=#fefefe
| 95122 ||  || — || January 9, 2002 || Socorro || LINEAR || ERI || align=right | 2.3 km || 
|-id=123 bgcolor=#E9E9E9
| 95123 ||  || — || January 9, 2002 || Socorro || LINEAR || — || align=right | 3.4 km || 
|-id=124 bgcolor=#fefefe
| 95124 ||  || — || January 13, 2002 || Socorro || LINEAR || — || align=right | 2.4 km || 
|-id=125 bgcolor=#fefefe
| 95125 ||  || — || January 13, 2002 || Socorro || LINEAR || V || align=right | 1.6 km || 
|-id=126 bgcolor=#fefefe
| 95126 ||  || — || January 13, 2002 || Socorro || LINEAR || — || align=right | 1.9 km || 
|-id=127 bgcolor=#E9E9E9
| 95127 ||  || — || January 14, 2002 || Socorro || LINEAR || — || align=right | 3.2 km || 
|-id=128 bgcolor=#E9E9E9
| 95128 ||  || — || January 14, 2002 || Socorro || LINEAR || — || align=right | 5.0 km || 
|-id=129 bgcolor=#fefefe
| 95129 ||  || — || January 14, 2002 || Socorro || LINEAR || ERI || align=right | 3.2 km || 
|-id=130 bgcolor=#fefefe
| 95130 ||  || — || January 14, 2002 || Socorro || LINEAR || V || align=right | 1.6 km || 
|-id=131 bgcolor=#fefefe
| 95131 ||  || — || January 14, 2002 || Socorro || LINEAR || MAS || align=right | 4.1 km || 
|-id=132 bgcolor=#d6d6d6
| 95132 ||  || — || January 14, 2002 || Socorro || LINEAR || — || align=right | 6.4 km || 
|-id=133 bgcolor=#E9E9E9
| 95133 ||  || — || January 14, 2002 || Socorro || LINEAR || — || align=right | 2.0 km || 
|-id=134 bgcolor=#E9E9E9
| 95134 ||  || — || January 13, 2002 || Socorro || LINEAR || — || align=right | 3.0 km || 
|-id=135 bgcolor=#E9E9E9
| 95135 ||  || — || January 13, 2002 || Socorro || LINEAR || — || align=right | 1.8 km || 
|-id=136 bgcolor=#E9E9E9
| 95136 ||  || — || January 13, 2002 || Socorro || LINEAR || — || align=right | 3.3 km || 
|-id=137 bgcolor=#fefefe
| 95137 ||  || — || January 13, 2002 || Socorro || LINEAR || — || align=right | 1.7 km || 
|-id=138 bgcolor=#E9E9E9
| 95138 ||  || — || January 13, 2002 || Socorro || LINEAR || HEN || align=right | 2.1 km || 
|-id=139 bgcolor=#E9E9E9
| 95139 ||  || — || January 13, 2002 || Socorro || LINEAR || — || align=right | 1.8 km || 
|-id=140 bgcolor=#fefefe
| 95140 ||  || — || January 13, 2002 || Socorro || LINEAR || MAS || align=right | 1.5 km || 
|-id=141 bgcolor=#fefefe
| 95141 ||  || — || January 13, 2002 || Socorro || LINEAR || — || align=right | 1.7 km || 
|-id=142 bgcolor=#fefefe
| 95142 ||  || — || January 13, 2002 || Socorro || LINEAR || — || align=right | 1.9 km || 
|-id=143 bgcolor=#fefefe
| 95143 ||  || — || January 13, 2002 || Socorro || LINEAR || NYSfast? || align=right | 1.4 km || 
|-id=144 bgcolor=#E9E9E9
| 95144 ||  || — || January 13, 2002 || Socorro || LINEAR || — || align=right | 1.5 km || 
|-id=145 bgcolor=#fefefe
| 95145 ||  || — || January 13, 2002 || Socorro || LINEAR || NYS || align=right | 1.3 km || 
|-id=146 bgcolor=#E9E9E9
| 95146 ||  || — || January 13, 2002 || Socorro || LINEAR || — || align=right | 2.6 km || 
|-id=147 bgcolor=#E9E9E9
| 95147 ||  || — || January 13, 2002 || Socorro || LINEAR || — || align=right | 5.1 km || 
|-id=148 bgcolor=#E9E9E9
| 95148 ||  || — || January 13, 2002 || Socorro || LINEAR || HNS || align=right | 2.5 km || 
|-id=149 bgcolor=#E9E9E9
| 95149 ||  || — || January 13, 2002 || Socorro || LINEAR || — || align=right | 2.6 km || 
|-id=150 bgcolor=#E9E9E9
| 95150 ||  || — || January 13, 2002 || Socorro || LINEAR || MAR || align=right | 2.7 km || 
|-id=151 bgcolor=#fefefe
| 95151 ||  || — || January 13, 2002 || Socorro || LINEAR || — || align=right | 2.1 km || 
|-id=152 bgcolor=#fefefe
| 95152 ||  || — || January 13, 2002 || Socorro || LINEAR || — || align=right | 2.3 km || 
|-id=153 bgcolor=#E9E9E9
| 95153 ||  || — || January 14, 2002 || Socorro || LINEAR || — || align=right | 2.2 km || 
|-id=154 bgcolor=#E9E9E9
| 95154 ||  || — || January 14, 2002 || Socorro || LINEAR || — || align=right | 1.6 km || 
|-id=155 bgcolor=#E9E9E9
| 95155 ||  || — || January 14, 2002 || Socorro || LINEAR || WIT || align=right | 2.0 km || 
|-id=156 bgcolor=#E9E9E9
| 95156 ||  || — || January 14, 2002 || Socorro || LINEAR || — || align=right | 2.9 km || 
|-id=157 bgcolor=#E9E9E9
| 95157 ||  || — || January 14, 2002 || Socorro || LINEAR || — || align=right | 4.2 km || 
|-id=158 bgcolor=#fefefe
| 95158 ||  || — || January 14, 2002 || Socorro || LINEAR || — || align=right | 1.7 km || 
|-id=159 bgcolor=#E9E9E9
| 95159 ||  || — || January 14, 2002 || Socorro || LINEAR || — || align=right | 3.1 km || 
|-id=160 bgcolor=#fefefe
| 95160 ||  || — || January 14, 2002 || Socorro || LINEAR || — || align=right | 2.9 km || 
|-id=161 bgcolor=#E9E9E9
| 95161 ||  || — || January 14, 2002 || Socorro || LINEAR || — || align=right | 3.1 km || 
|-id=162 bgcolor=#fefefe
| 95162 ||  || — || January 14, 2002 || Socorro || LINEAR || MAS || align=right | 1.5 km || 
|-id=163 bgcolor=#fefefe
| 95163 ||  || — || January 14, 2002 || Socorro || LINEAR || NYS || align=right | 1.5 km || 
|-id=164 bgcolor=#E9E9E9
| 95164 ||  || — || January 14, 2002 || Socorro || LINEAR || HEN || align=right | 2.5 km || 
|-id=165 bgcolor=#E9E9E9
| 95165 ||  || — || January 12, 2002 || Nyukasa || Mount Nyukasa Stn. || — || align=right | 2.7 km || 
|-id=166 bgcolor=#E9E9E9
| 95166 ||  || — || January 6, 2002 || Palomar || NEAT || — || align=right | 2.2 km || 
|-id=167 bgcolor=#E9E9E9
| 95167 ||  || — || January 7, 2002 || Anderson Mesa || LONEOS || — || align=right | 2.5 km || 
|-id=168 bgcolor=#fefefe
| 95168 ||  || — || January 8, 2002 || Socorro || LINEAR || — || align=right | 1.3 km || 
|-id=169 bgcolor=#fefefe
| 95169 ||  || — || January 8, 2002 || Socorro || LINEAR || — || align=right | 1.3 km || 
|-id=170 bgcolor=#fefefe
| 95170 ||  || — || January 8, 2002 || Socorro || LINEAR || V || align=right | 1.7 km || 
|-id=171 bgcolor=#fefefe
| 95171 ||  || — || January 10, 2002 || Palomar || NEAT || — || align=right | 2.0 km || 
|-id=172 bgcolor=#E9E9E9
| 95172 ||  || — || January 11, 2002 || Palomar || NEAT || HNS || align=right | 2.6 km || 
|-id=173 bgcolor=#d6d6d6
| 95173 ||  || — || January 11, 2002 || Socorro || LINEAR || EOS || align=right | 5.3 km || 
|-id=174 bgcolor=#fefefe
| 95174 ||  || — || January 12, 2002 || Kitt Peak || Spacewatch || — || align=right | 1.7 km || 
|-id=175 bgcolor=#E9E9E9
| 95175 ||  || — || January 12, 2002 || Kitt Peak || Spacewatch || — || align=right | 5.2 km || 
|-id=176 bgcolor=#E9E9E9
| 95176 ||  || — || January 12, 2002 || Socorro || LINEAR || — || align=right | 5.9 km || 
|-id=177 bgcolor=#fefefe
| 95177 ||  || — || January 14, 2002 || Palomar || NEAT || — || align=right | 2.2 km || 
|-id=178 bgcolor=#E9E9E9
| 95178 ||  || — || January 11, 2002 || Socorro || LINEAR || — || align=right | 4.0 km || 
|-id=179 bgcolor=#fefefe
| 95179 Berkó || 2002 BO ||  || January 16, 2002 || Piszkéstető || K. Sárneczky, Z. Heiner || MAS || align=right | 1.4 km || 
|-id=180 bgcolor=#fefefe
| 95180 ||  || — || January 19, 2002 || Anderson Mesa || LONEOS || KLI || align=right | 3.7 km || 
|-id=181 bgcolor=#fefefe
| 95181 ||  || — || January 19, 2002 || Anderson Mesa || LONEOS || — || align=right | 2.5 km || 
|-id=182 bgcolor=#E9E9E9
| 95182 ||  || — || January 19, 2002 || Anderson Mesa || LONEOS || — || align=right | 4.0 km || 
|-id=183 bgcolor=#E9E9E9
| 95183 ||  || — || January 18, 2002 || Socorro || LINEAR || ADE || align=right | 5.5 km || 
|-id=184 bgcolor=#fefefe
| 95184 ||  || — || January 18, 2002 || Socorro || LINEAR || — || align=right | 1.5 km || 
|-id=185 bgcolor=#fefefe
| 95185 ||  || — || January 18, 2002 || Socorro || LINEAR || — || align=right | 1.7 km || 
|-id=186 bgcolor=#fefefe
| 95186 ||  || — || January 18, 2002 || Socorro || LINEAR || NYS || align=right | 1.9 km || 
|-id=187 bgcolor=#d6d6d6
| 95187 ||  || — || January 18, 2002 || Socorro || LINEAR || BRA || align=right | 3.1 km || 
|-id=188 bgcolor=#d6d6d6
| 95188 ||  || — || January 19, 2002 || Socorro || LINEAR || — || align=right | 6.7 km || 
|-id=189 bgcolor=#fefefe
| 95189 ||  || — || January 19, 2002 || Socorro || LINEAR || — || align=right | 1.6 km || 
|-id=190 bgcolor=#fefefe
| 95190 ||  || — || January 19, 2002 || Socorro || LINEAR || MAS || align=right | 1.7 km || 
|-id=191 bgcolor=#fefefe
| 95191 ||  || — || January 19, 2002 || Socorro || LINEAR || NYS || align=right | 1.6 km || 
|-id=192 bgcolor=#E9E9E9
| 95192 ||  || — || January 20, 2002 || Kitt Peak || Spacewatch || — || align=right | 1.5 km || 
|-id=193 bgcolor=#E9E9E9
| 95193 ||  || — || January 19, 2002 || Socorro || LINEAR || — || align=right | 5.1 km || 
|-id=194 bgcolor=#E9E9E9
| 95194 ||  || — || January 19, 2002 || Socorro || LINEAR || — || align=right | 4.3 km || 
|-id=195 bgcolor=#E9E9E9
| 95195 ||  || — || January 19, 2002 || Socorro || LINEAR || — || align=right | 5.6 km || 
|-id=196 bgcolor=#d6d6d6
| 95196 ||  || — || January 19, 2002 || Socorro || LINEAR || — || align=right | 6.3 km || 
|-id=197 bgcolor=#E9E9E9
| 95197 ||  || — || January 19, 2002 || Socorro || LINEAR || — || align=right | 4.0 km || 
|-id=198 bgcolor=#fefefe
| 95198 ||  || — || January 21, 2002 || Socorro || LINEAR || — || align=right | 1.7 km || 
|-id=199 bgcolor=#d6d6d6
| 95199 ||  || — || January 21, 2002 || Socorro || LINEAR || — || align=right | 4.1 km || 
|-id=200 bgcolor=#E9E9E9
| 95200 ||  || — || January 21, 2002 || Socorro || LINEAR || RAF || align=right | 2.3 km || 
|}

95201–95300 

|-bgcolor=#E9E9E9
| 95201 ||  || — || January 21, 2002 || Palomar || NEAT || — || align=right | 3.0 km || 
|-id=202 bgcolor=#fefefe
| 95202 ||  || — || January 25, 2002 || Socorro || LINEAR || PHO || align=right | 3.1 km || 
|-id=203 bgcolor=#E9E9E9
| 95203 ||  || — || January 23, 2002 || Socorro || LINEAR || — || align=right | 3.7 km || 
|-id=204 bgcolor=#E9E9E9
| 95204 ||  || — || January 23, 2002 || Socorro || LINEAR || — || align=right | 2.4 km || 
|-id=205 bgcolor=#fefefe
| 95205 ||  || — || January 23, 2002 || Socorro || LINEAR || — || align=right | 1.6 km || 
|-id=206 bgcolor=#E9E9E9
| 95206 ||  || — || January 25, 2002 || Palomar || NEAT || GEF || align=right | 3.1 km || 
|-id=207 bgcolor=#d6d6d6
| 95207 ||  || — || January 20, 2002 || Anderson Mesa || LONEOS || — || align=right | 8.3 km || 
|-id=208 bgcolor=#d6d6d6
| 95208 ||  || — || January 23, 2002 || Socorro || LINEAR || EOS || align=right | 4.4 km || 
|-id=209 bgcolor=#d6d6d6
| 95209 || 2002 CW || — || February 2, 2002 || Cima Ekar || ADAS || EOS || align=right | 3.7 km || 
|-id=210 bgcolor=#E9E9E9
| 95210 ||  || — || February 3, 2002 || Anderson Mesa || LONEOS || — || align=right | 5.8 km || 
|-id=211 bgcolor=#E9E9E9
| 95211 ||  || — || February 3, 2002 || Palomar || NEAT || — || align=right | 2.6 km || 
|-id=212 bgcolor=#fefefe
| 95212 ||  || — || February 3, 2002 || Palomar || NEAT || — || align=right | 1.8 km || 
|-id=213 bgcolor=#E9E9E9
| 95213 ||  || — || February 1, 2002 || Socorro || LINEAR || — || align=right | 4.0 km || 
|-id=214 bgcolor=#E9E9E9
| 95214 ||  || — || February 6, 2002 || Desert Eagle || W. K. Y. Yeung || — || align=right | 6.5 km || 
|-id=215 bgcolor=#E9E9E9
| 95215 ||  || — || February 3, 2002 || Palomar || NEAT || — || align=right | 4.0 km || 
|-id=216 bgcolor=#fefefe
| 95216 ||  || — || February 5, 2002 || Palomar || NEAT || — || align=right | 4.5 km || 
|-id=217 bgcolor=#d6d6d6
| 95217 ||  || — || February 6, 2002 || Desert Eagle || W. K. Y. Yeung || THM || align=right | 7.9 km || 
|-id=218 bgcolor=#E9E9E9
| 95218 ||  || — || February 8, 2002 || Ametlla de Mar || J. Nomen || — || align=right | 1.9 km || 
|-id=219 bgcolor=#d6d6d6
| 95219 Borgman ||  ||  || February 8, 2002 || Needville || Needville Obs. || ALA || align=right | 5.3 km || 
|-id=220 bgcolor=#E9E9E9
| 95220 ||  || — || February 8, 2002 || Fountain Hills || C. W. Juels, P. R. Holvorcem || — || align=right | 2.9 km || 
|-id=221 bgcolor=#d6d6d6
| 95221 ||  || — || February 8, 2002 || Desert Eagle || W. K. Y. Yeung || EOS || align=right | 3.1 km || 
|-id=222 bgcolor=#fefefe
| 95222 ||  || — || February 6, 2002 || Socorro || LINEAR || — || align=right | 1.7 km || 
|-id=223 bgcolor=#E9E9E9
| 95223 ||  || — || February 5, 2002 || Palomar || NEAT || — || align=right | 3.8 km || 
|-id=224 bgcolor=#E9E9E9
| 95224 ||  || — || February 5, 2002 || Haleakala || NEAT || EUN || align=right | 2.6 km || 
|-id=225 bgcolor=#E9E9E9
| 95225 ||  || — || February 5, 2002 || Haleakala || NEAT || RAF || align=right | 2.4 km || 
|-id=226 bgcolor=#fefefe
| 95226 ||  || — || February 6, 2002 || Palomar || NEAT || V || align=right | 1.2 km || 
|-id=227 bgcolor=#fefefe
| 95227 ||  || — || February 7, 2002 || Socorro || LINEAR || — || align=right | 1.4 km || 
|-id=228 bgcolor=#E9E9E9
| 95228 ||  || — || February 6, 2002 || Socorro || LINEAR || EUN || align=right | 3.0 km || 
|-id=229 bgcolor=#fefefe
| 95229 ||  || — || February 6, 2002 || Socorro || LINEAR || V || align=right | 1.6 km || 
|-id=230 bgcolor=#E9E9E9
| 95230 ||  || — || February 6, 2002 || Socorro || LINEAR || — || align=right | 5.7 km || 
|-id=231 bgcolor=#E9E9E9
| 95231 ||  || — || February 6, 2002 || Socorro || LINEAR || — || align=right | 2.1 km || 
|-id=232 bgcolor=#d6d6d6
| 95232 ||  || — || February 6, 2002 || Socorro || LINEAR || — || align=right | 6.4 km || 
|-id=233 bgcolor=#d6d6d6
| 95233 ||  || — || February 7, 2002 || Socorro || LINEAR || — || align=right | 5.0 km || 
|-id=234 bgcolor=#E9E9E9
| 95234 ||  || — || February 7, 2002 || Socorro || LINEAR || AGN || align=right | 2.4 km || 
|-id=235 bgcolor=#d6d6d6
| 95235 ||  || — || February 11, 2002 || Desert Eagle || W. K. Y. Yeung || KOR || align=right | 2.9 km || 
|-id=236 bgcolor=#E9E9E9
| 95236 ||  || — || February 7, 2002 || Palomar || NEAT || — || align=right | 3.7 km || 
|-id=237 bgcolor=#d6d6d6
| 95237 ||  || — || February 7, 2002 || Palomar || NEAT || — || align=right | 6.4 km || 
|-id=238 bgcolor=#d6d6d6
| 95238 ||  || — || February 12, 2002 || Fountain Hills || C. W. Juels, P. R. Holvorcem || — || align=right | 8.6 km || 
|-id=239 bgcolor=#E9E9E9
| 95239 ||  || — || February 6, 2002 || Goodricke-Pigott || R. A. Tucker || ADE || align=right | 4.0 km || 
|-id=240 bgcolor=#d6d6d6
| 95240 ||  || — || February 3, 2002 || Haleakala || NEAT || 7:4 || align=right | 9.9 km || 
|-id=241 bgcolor=#d6d6d6
| 95241 ||  || — || February 6, 2002 || Desert Eagle || W. K. Y. Yeung || — || align=right | 5.0 km || 
|-id=242 bgcolor=#d6d6d6
| 95242 ||  || — || February 12, 2002 || Desert Eagle || W. K. Y. Yeung || — || align=right | 5.6 km || 
|-id=243 bgcolor=#E9E9E9
| 95243 ||  || — || February 12, 2002 || Desert Eagle || W. K. Y. Yeung || — || align=right | 5.0 km || 
|-id=244 bgcolor=#d6d6d6
| 95244 ||  || — || February 12, 2002 || Desert Eagle || W. K. Y. Yeung || — || align=right | 5.9 km || 
|-id=245 bgcolor=#d6d6d6
| 95245 ||  || — || February 12, 2002 || Desert Eagle || W. K. Y. Yeung || — || align=right | 4.2 km || 
|-id=246 bgcolor=#d6d6d6
| 95246 ||  || — || February 12, 2002 || Desert Eagle || W. K. Y. Yeung || — || align=right | 8.5 km || 
|-id=247 bgcolor=#d6d6d6
| 95247 Schalansky ||  ||  || February 12, 2002 || Desert Eagle || W. K. Y. Yeung || URS || align=right | 7.0 km || 
|-id=248 bgcolor=#E9E9E9
| 95248 ||  || — || February 7, 2002 || Socorro || LINEAR || — || align=right | 4.0 km || 
|-id=249 bgcolor=#d6d6d6
| 95249 ||  || — || February 7, 2002 || Socorro || LINEAR || — || align=right | 4.4 km || 
|-id=250 bgcolor=#E9E9E9
| 95250 ||  || — || February 7, 2002 || Socorro || LINEAR || MRX || align=right | 2.2 km || 
|-id=251 bgcolor=#fefefe
| 95251 ||  || — || February 7, 2002 || Socorro || LINEAR || — || align=right | 2.0 km || 
|-id=252 bgcolor=#E9E9E9
| 95252 ||  || — || February 7, 2002 || Socorro || LINEAR || — || align=right | 7.5 km || 
|-id=253 bgcolor=#d6d6d6
| 95253 ||  || — || February 7, 2002 || Socorro || LINEAR || — || align=right | 4.3 km || 
|-id=254 bgcolor=#E9E9E9
| 95254 ||  || — || February 7, 2002 || Socorro || LINEAR || — || align=right | 2.5 km || 
|-id=255 bgcolor=#d6d6d6
| 95255 ||  || — || February 7, 2002 || Socorro || LINEAR || — || align=right | 7.7 km || 
|-id=256 bgcolor=#E9E9E9
| 95256 ||  || — || February 6, 2002 || Kitt Peak || Spacewatch || — || align=right | 3.2 km || 
|-id=257 bgcolor=#d6d6d6
| 95257 ||  || — || February 12, 2002 || Desert Eagle || W. K. Y. Yeung || — || align=right | 5.8 km || 
|-id=258 bgcolor=#d6d6d6
| 95258 ||  || — || February 12, 2002 || Desert Eagle || W. K. Y. Yeung || THM || align=right | 6.4 km || 
|-id=259 bgcolor=#fefefe
| 95259 ||  || — || February 12, 2002 || Desert Eagle || W. K. Y. Yeung || NYS || align=right | 1.3 km || 
|-id=260 bgcolor=#d6d6d6
| 95260 ||  || — || February 13, 2002 || Desert Eagle || W. K. Y. Yeung || — || align=right | 7.3 km || 
|-id=261 bgcolor=#d6d6d6
| 95261 ||  || — || February 6, 2002 || Socorro || LINEAR || — || align=right | 7.0 km || 
|-id=262 bgcolor=#E9E9E9
| 95262 ||  || — || February 6, 2002 || Socorro || LINEAR || — || align=right | 2.8 km || 
|-id=263 bgcolor=#fefefe
| 95263 ||  || — || February 6, 2002 || Socorro || LINEAR || — || align=right | 1.8 km || 
|-id=264 bgcolor=#E9E9E9
| 95264 ||  || — || February 6, 2002 || Socorro || LINEAR || — || align=right | 5.0 km || 
|-id=265 bgcolor=#d6d6d6
| 95265 ||  || — || February 6, 2002 || Socorro || LINEAR || — || align=right | 6.2 km || 
|-id=266 bgcolor=#fefefe
| 95266 ||  || — || February 6, 2002 || Socorro || LINEAR || KLI || align=right | 3.5 km || 
|-id=267 bgcolor=#E9E9E9
| 95267 ||  || — || February 7, 2002 || Socorro || LINEAR || — || align=right | 4.5 km || 
|-id=268 bgcolor=#fefefe
| 95268 ||  || — || February 7, 2002 || Socorro || LINEAR || — || align=right | 3.1 km || 
|-id=269 bgcolor=#E9E9E9
| 95269 ||  || — || February 7, 2002 || Socorro || LINEAR || HOF || align=right | 5.6 km || 
|-id=270 bgcolor=#fefefe
| 95270 ||  || — || February 7, 2002 || Socorro || LINEAR || MAS || align=right | 1.2 km || 
|-id=271 bgcolor=#E9E9E9
| 95271 ||  || — || February 7, 2002 || Socorro || LINEAR || WIT || align=right | 1.9 km || 
|-id=272 bgcolor=#E9E9E9
| 95272 ||  || — || February 7, 2002 || Socorro || LINEAR || — || align=right | 4.2 km || 
|-id=273 bgcolor=#d6d6d6
| 95273 ||  || — || February 7, 2002 || Socorro || LINEAR || — || align=right | 4.6 km || 
|-id=274 bgcolor=#fefefe
| 95274 ||  || — || February 7, 2002 || Socorro || LINEAR || — || align=right | 1.4 km || 
|-id=275 bgcolor=#d6d6d6
| 95275 ||  || — || February 7, 2002 || Socorro || LINEAR || — || align=right | 6.8 km || 
|-id=276 bgcolor=#d6d6d6
| 95276 ||  || — || February 7, 2002 || Socorro || LINEAR || KAR || align=right | 2.2 km || 
|-id=277 bgcolor=#d6d6d6
| 95277 ||  || — || February 7, 2002 || Socorro || LINEAR || — || align=right | 4.9 km || 
|-id=278 bgcolor=#E9E9E9
| 95278 ||  || — || February 7, 2002 || Socorro || LINEAR || — || align=right | 4.2 km || 
|-id=279 bgcolor=#E9E9E9
| 95279 ||  || — || February 7, 2002 || Socorro || LINEAR || — || align=right | 3.2 km || 
|-id=280 bgcolor=#fefefe
| 95280 ||  || — || February 7, 2002 || Socorro || LINEAR || — || align=right | 1.4 km || 
|-id=281 bgcolor=#E9E9E9
| 95281 ||  || — || February 7, 2002 || Socorro || LINEAR || — || align=right | 3.3 km || 
|-id=282 bgcolor=#E9E9E9
| 95282 ||  || — || February 7, 2002 || Socorro || LINEAR || — || align=right | 2.8 km || 
|-id=283 bgcolor=#d6d6d6
| 95283 ||  || — || February 7, 2002 || Socorro || LINEAR || KOR || align=right | 3.2 km || 
|-id=284 bgcolor=#d6d6d6
| 95284 ||  || — || February 7, 2002 || Socorro || LINEAR || — || align=right | 5.5 km || 
|-id=285 bgcolor=#fefefe
| 95285 ||  || — || February 7, 2002 || Socorro || LINEAR || FLO || align=right | 1.4 km || 
|-id=286 bgcolor=#E9E9E9
| 95286 ||  || — || February 7, 2002 || Socorro || LINEAR || — || align=right | 2.3 km || 
|-id=287 bgcolor=#E9E9E9
| 95287 ||  || — || February 7, 2002 || Socorro || LINEAR || HEN || align=right | 1.9 km || 
|-id=288 bgcolor=#E9E9E9
| 95288 ||  || — || February 7, 2002 || Socorro || LINEAR || — || align=right | 4.1 km || 
|-id=289 bgcolor=#E9E9E9
| 95289 ||  || — || February 7, 2002 || Socorro || LINEAR || — || align=right | 4.5 km || 
|-id=290 bgcolor=#E9E9E9
| 95290 ||  || — || February 7, 2002 || Socorro || LINEAR || — || align=right | 3.5 km || 
|-id=291 bgcolor=#E9E9E9
| 95291 ||  || — || February 7, 2002 || Socorro || LINEAR || — || align=right | 3.9 km || 
|-id=292 bgcolor=#d6d6d6
| 95292 ||  || — || February 7, 2002 || Socorro || LINEAR || KOR || align=right | 3.1 km || 
|-id=293 bgcolor=#E9E9E9
| 95293 ||  || — || February 7, 2002 || Socorro || LINEAR || — || align=right | 4.5 km || 
|-id=294 bgcolor=#E9E9E9
| 95294 ||  || — || February 7, 2002 || Socorro || LINEAR || — || align=right | 5.0 km || 
|-id=295 bgcolor=#d6d6d6
| 95295 ||  || — || February 7, 2002 || Socorro || LINEAR || KOR || align=right | 2.8 km || 
|-id=296 bgcolor=#d6d6d6
| 95296 ||  || — || February 7, 2002 || Socorro || LINEAR || EOS || align=right | 4.1 km || 
|-id=297 bgcolor=#E9E9E9
| 95297 ||  || — || February 7, 2002 || Socorro || LINEAR || — || align=right | 3.4 km || 
|-id=298 bgcolor=#d6d6d6
| 95298 ||  || — || February 7, 2002 || Socorro || LINEAR || THM || align=right | 6.1 km || 
|-id=299 bgcolor=#E9E9E9
| 95299 ||  || — || February 7, 2002 || Socorro || LINEAR || — || align=right | 1.9 km || 
|-id=300 bgcolor=#d6d6d6
| 95300 ||  || — || February 7, 2002 || Socorro || LINEAR || THM || align=right | 5.8 km || 
|}

95301–95400 

|-bgcolor=#d6d6d6
| 95301 ||  || — || February 7, 2002 || Socorro || LINEAR || EOS || align=right | 4.0 km || 
|-id=302 bgcolor=#d6d6d6
| 95302 ||  || — || February 7, 2002 || Socorro || LINEAR || KOR || align=right | 3.0 km || 
|-id=303 bgcolor=#E9E9E9
| 95303 ||  || — || February 7, 2002 || Socorro || LINEAR || — || align=right | 3.0 km || 
|-id=304 bgcolor=#E9E9E9
| 95304 ||  || — || February 7, 2002 || Socorro || LINEAR || AST || align=right | 4.9 km || 
|-id=305 bgcolor=#d6d6d6
| 95305 ||  || — || February 7, 2002 || Socorro || LINEAR || — || align=right | 7.3 km || 
|-id=306 bgcolor=#E9E9E9
| 95306 ||  || — || February 7, 2002 || Socorro || LINEAR || — || align=right | 4.0 km || 
|-id=307 bgcolor=#fefefe
| 95307 ||  || — || February 7, 2002 || Socorro || LINEAR || NYS || align=right | 1.7 km || 
|-id=308 bgcolor=#E9E9E9
| 95308 ||  || — || February 7, 2002 || Socorro || LINEAR || — || align=right | 3.3 km || 
|-id=309 bgcolor=#d6d6d6
| 95309 ||  || — || February 7, 2002 || Socorro || LINEAR || CHA || align=right | 4.8 km || 
|-id=310 bgcolor=#E9E9E9
| 95310 ||  || — || February 7, 2002 || Socorro || LINEAR || PAD || align=right | 4.8 km || 
|-id=311 bgcolor=#d6d6d6
| 95311 ||  || — || February 7, 2002 || Socorro || LINEAR || — || align=right | 5.5 km || 
|-id=312 bgcolor=#d6d6d6
| 95312 ||  || — || February 7, 2002 || Socorro || LINEAR || EOS || align=right | 4.4 km || 
|-id=313 bgcolor=#d6d6d6
| 95313 ||  || — || February 7, 2002 || Socorro || LINEAR || THM || align=right | 6.9 km || 
|-id=314 bgcolor=#E9E9E9
| 95314 ||  || — || February 7, 2002 || Socorro || LINEAR || HOF || align=right | 5.5 km || 
|-id=315 bgcolor=#d6d6d6
| 95315 ||  || — || February 7, 2002 || Socorro || LINEAR || — || align=right | 6.8 km || 
|-id=316 bgcolor=#d6d6d6
| 95316 ||  || — || February 7, 2002 || Socorro || LINEAR || EOS || align=right | 4.2 km || 
|-id=317 bgcolor=#d6d6d6
| 95317 ||  || — || February 7, 2002 || Socorro || LINEAR || — || align=right | 4.5 km || 
|-id=318 bgcolor=#d6d6d6
| 95318 ||  || — || February 7, 2002 || Socorro || LINEAR || SYL7:4 || align=right | 8.2 km || 
|-id=319 bgcolor=#fefefe
| 95319 ||  || — || February 7, 2002 || Socorro || LINEAR || NYS || align=right | 1.4 km || 
|-id=320 bgcolor=#E9E9E9
| 95320 ||  || — || February 7, 2002 || Socorro || LINEAR || — || align=right | 5.2 km || 
|-id=321 bgcolor=#d6d6d6
| 95321 ||  || — || February 7, 2002 || Socorro || LINEAR || — || align=right | 7.7 km || 
|-id=322 bgcolor=#E9E9E9
| 95322 ||  || — || February 7, 2002 || Socorro || LINEAR || — || align=right | 5.0 km || 
|-id=323 bgcolor=#E9E9E9
| 95323 ||  || — || February 7, 2002 || Socorro || LINEAR || — || align=right | 2.9 km || 
|-id=324 bgcolor=#E9E9E9
| 95324 ||  || — || February 7, 2002 || Socorro || LINEAR || GAL || align=right | 3.4 km || 
|-id=325 bgcolor=#d6d6d6
| 95325 ||  || — || February 7, 2002 || Socorro || LINEAR || — || align=right | 6.1 km || 
|-id=326 bgcolor=#d6d6d6
| 95326 ||  || — || February 7, 2002 || Socorro || LINEAR || — || align=right | 3.5 km || 
|-id=327 bgcolor=#d6d6d6
| 95327 ||  || — || February 7, 2002 || Socorro || LINEAR || — || align=right | 4.7 km || 
|-id=328 bgcolor=#E9E9E9
| 95328 ||  || — || February 7, 2002 || Socorro || LINEAR || HOF || align=right | 5.9 km || 
|-id=329 bgcolor=#d6d6d6
| 95329 ||  || — || February 7, 2002 || Socorro || LINEAR || — || align=right | 5.5 km || 
|-id=330 bgcolor=#E9E9E9
| 95330 ||  || — || February 8, 2002 || Socorro || LINEAR || — || align=right | 2.7 km || 
|-id=331 bgcolor=#fefefe
| 95331 ||  || — || February 8, 2002 || Socorro || LINEAR || — || align=right | 2.4 km || 
|-id=332 bgcolor=#d6d6d6
| 95332 ||  || — || February 9, 2002 || Anderson Mesa || LONEOS || — || align=right | 7.8 km || 
|-id=333 bgcolor=#d6d6d6
| 95333 ||  || — || February 14, 2002 || Desert Eagle || W. K. Y. Yeung || EOS || align=right | 4.8 km || 
|-id=334 bgcolor=#E9E9E9
| 95334 ||  || — || February 14, 2002 || Desert Eagle || W. K. Y. Yeung || — || align=right | 3.6 km || 
|-id=335 bgcolor=#d6d6d6
| 95335 ||  || — || February 3, 2002 || Uccle || E. W. Elst, H. Debehogne || — || align=right | 6.6 km || 
|-id=336 bgcolor=#E9E9E9
| 95336 ||  || — || February 7, 2002 || Socorro || LINEAR || — || align=right | 2.0 km || 
|-id=337 bgcolor=#d6d6d6
| 95337 ||  || — || February 7, 2002 || Socorro || LINEAR || — || align=right | 5.3 km || 
|-id=338 bgcolor=#fefefe
| 95338 ||  || — || February 7, 2002 || Socorro || LINEAR || — || align=right | 1.4 km || 
|-id=339 bgcolor=#E9E9E9
| 95339 ||  || — || February 7, 2002 || Socorro || LINEAR || XIZ || align=right | 2.6 km || 
|-id=340 bgcolor=#fefefe
| 95340 ||  || — || February 7, 2002 || Socorro || LINEAR || — || align=right | 1.5 km || 
|-id=341 bgcolor=#E9E9E9
| 95341 ||  || — || February 7, 2002 || Socorro || LINEAR || — || align=right | 4.5 km || 
|-id=342 bgcolor=#d6d6d6
| 95342 ||  || — || February 7, 2002 || Socorro || LINEAR || KOR || align=right | 2.8 km || 
|-id=343 bgcolor=#E9E9E9
| 95343 ||  || — || February 7, 2002 || Socorro || LINEAR || — || align=right | 2.8 km || 
|-id=344 bgcolor=#d6d6d6
| 95344 ||  || — || February 7, 2002 || Socorro || LINEAR || EOS || align=right | 4.0 km || 
|-id=345 bgcolor=#E9E9E9
| 95345 ||  || — || February 7, 2002 || Socorro || LINEAR || — || align=right | 3.0 km || 
|-id=346 bgcolor=#fefefe
| 95346 ||  || — || February 8, 2002 || Socorro || LINEAR || V || align=right | 1.4 km || 
|-id=347 bgcolor=#fefefe
| 95347 ||  || — || February 8, 2002 || Socorro || LINEAR || — || align=right | 1.7 km || 
|-id=348 bgcolor=#E9E9E9
| 95348 ||  || — || February 8, 2002 || Socorro || LINEAR || — || align=right | 2.3 km || 
|-id=349 bgcolor=#E9E9E9
| 95349 ||  || — || February 8, 2002 || Socorro || LINEAR || GEF || align=right | 2.8 km || 
|-id=350 bgcolor=#fefefe
| 95350 ||  || — || February 8, 2002 || Socorro || LINEAR || — || align=right | 1.9 km || 
|-id=351 bgcolor=#E9E9E9
| 95351 ||  || — || February 8, 2002 || Socorro || LINEAR || — || align=right | 4.4 km || 
|-id=352 bgcolor=#E9E9E9
| 95352 ||  || — || February 8, 2002 || Socorro || LINEAR || MRX || align=right | 2.1 km || 
|-id=353 bgcolor=#E9E9E9
| 95353 ||  || — || February 8, 2002 || Socorro || LINEAR || — || align=right | 2.5 km || 
|-id=354 bgcolor=#E9E9E9
| 95354 ||  || — || February 8, 2002 || Socorro || LINEAR || — || align=right | 3.3 km || 
|-id=355 bgcolor=#E9E9E9
| 95355 ||  || — || February 8, 2002 || Socorro || LINEAR || GEFslow || align=right | 3.5 km || 
|-id=356 bgcolor=#d6d6d6
| 95356 ||  || — || February 8, 2002 || Socorro || LINEAR || THB || align=right | 9.0 km || 
|-id=357 bgcolor=#fefefe
| 95357 ||  || — || February 9, 2002 || Socorro || LINEAR || NYS || align=right | 1.3 km || 
|-id=358 bgcolor=#d6d6d6
| 95358 ||  || — || February 9, 2002 || Socorro || LINEAR || AEG || align=right | 6.2 km || 
|-id=359 bgcolor=#E9E9E9
| 95359 ||  || — || February 9, 2002 || Socorro || LINEAR || — || align=right | 3.6 km || 
|-id=360 bgcolor=#d6d6d6
| 95360 ||  || — || February 9, 2002 || Socorro || LINEAR || — || align=right | 6.7 km || 
|-id=361 bgcolor=#d6d6d6
| 95361 ||  || — || February 9, 2002 || Socorro || LINEAR || — || align=right | 5.1 km || 
|-id=362 bgcolor=#d6d6d6
| 95362 ||  || — || February 9, 2002 || Socorro || LINEAR || — || align=right | 5.0 km || 
|-id=363 bgcolor=#d6d6d6
| 95363 ||  || — || February 9, 2002 || Socorro || LINEAR || EUP || align=right | 8.5 km || 
|-id=364 bgcolor=#d6d6d6
| 95364 ||  || — || February 10, 2002 || Socorro || LINEAR || KOR || align=right | 3.0 km || 
|-id=365 bgcolor=#d6d6d6
| 95365 ||  || — || February 6, 2002 || Socorro || LINEAR || — || align=right | 5.2 km || 
|-id=366 bgcolor=#fefefe
| 95366 ||  || — || February 7, 2002 || Socorro || LINEAR || NYS || align=right | 2.8 km || 
|-id=367 bgcolor=#d6d6d6
| 95367 ||  || — || February 7, 2002 || Socorro || LINEAR || EOS || align=right | 4.0 km || 
|-id=368 bgcolor=#fefefe
| 95368 ||  || — || February 8, 2002 || Socorro || LINEAR || — || align=right | 2.7 km || 
|-id=369 bgcolor=#fefefe
| 95369 ||  || — || February 8, 2002 || Socorro || LINEAR || ERI || align=right | 2.4 km || 
|-id=370 bgcolor=#E9E9E9
| 95370 ||  || — || February 8, 2002 || Socorro || LINEAR || — || align=right | 3.5 km || 
|-id=371 bgcolor=#E9E9E9
| 95371 ||  || — || February 8, 2002 || Socorro || LINEAR || — || align=right | 3.3 km || 
|-id=372 bgcolor=#E9E9E9
| 95372 ||  || — || February 8, 2002 || Socorro || LINEAR || AGN || align=right | 2.5 km || 
|-id=373 bgcolor=#E9E9E9
| 95373 ||  || — || February 8, 2002 || Socorro || LINEAR || — || align=right | 2.0 km || 
|-id=374 bgcolor=#fefefe
| 95374 ||  || — || February 8, 2002 || Socorro || LINEAR || NYS || align=right | 1.2 km || 
|-id=375 bgcolor=#fefefe
| 95375 ||  || — || February 8, 2002 || Socorro || LINEAR || — || align=right | 1.5 km || 
|-id=376 bgcolor=#E9E9E9
| 95376 ||  || — || February 8, 2002 || Socorro || LINEAR || — || align=right | 3.5 km || 
|-id=377 bgcolor=#E9E9E9
| 95377 ||  || — || February 8, 2002 || Socorro || LINEAR || — || align=right | 2.8 km || 
|-id=378 bgcolor=#fefefe
| 95378 ||  || — || February 8, 2002 || Socorro || LINEAR || — || align=right | 2.4 km || 
|-id=379 bgcolor=#d6d6d6
| 95379 ||  || — || February 8, 2002 || Socorro || LINEAR || — || align=right | 5.6 km || 
|-id=380 bgcolor=#E9E9E9
| 95380 ||  || — || February 8, 2002 || Socorro || LINEAR || — || align=right | 6.4 km || 
|-id=381 bgcolor=#d6d6d6
| 95381 ||  || — || February 8, 2002 || Socorro || LINEAR || — || align=right | 7.2 km || 
|-id=382 bgcolor=#fefefe
| 95382 ||  || — || February 8, 2002 || Socorro || LINEAR || — || align=right | 1.8 km || 
|-id=383 bgcolor=#E9E9E9
| 95383 ||  || — || February 8, 2002 || Socorro || LINEAR || PAD || align=right | 5.1 km || 
|-id=384 bgcolor=#d6d6d6
| 95384 ||  || — || February 8, 2002 || Socorro || LINEAR || — || align=right | 5.1 km || 
|-id=385 bgcolor=#d6d6d6
| 95385 ||  || — || February 8, 2002 || Socorro || LINEAR || EOS || align=right | 4.2 km || 
|-id=386 bgcolor=#E9E9E9
| 95386 ||  || — || February 8, 2002 || Socorro || LINEAR || — || align=right | 2.0 km || 
|-id=387 bgcolor=#E9E9E9
| 95387 ||  || — || February 8, 2002 || Socorro || LINEAR || — || align=right | 4.1 km || 
|-id=388 bgcolor=#d6d6d6
| 95388 ||  || — || February 8, 2002 || Socorro || LINEAR || — || align=right | 5.3 km || 
|-id=389 bgcolor=#E9E9E9
| 95389 ||  || — || February 8, 2002 || Socorro || LINEAR || — || align=right | 4.3 km || 
|-id=390 bgcolor=#d6d6d6
| 95390 ||  || — || February 8, 2002 || Socorro || LINEAR || — || align=right | 4.7 km || 
|-id=391 bgcolor=#E9E9E9
| 95391 ||  || — || February 8, 2002 || Socorro || LINEAR || JUN || align=right | 2.5 km || 
|-id=392 bgcolor=#E9E9E9
| 95392 ||  || — || February 10, 2002 || Socorro || LINEAR || — || align=right | 4.7 km || 
|-id=393 bgcolor=#E9E9E9
| 95393 ||  || — || February 10, 2002 || Socorro || LINEAR || — || align=right | 4.3 km || 
|-id=394 bgcolor=#E9E9E9
| 95394 ||  || — || February 10, 2002 || Socorro || LINEAR || — || align=right | 3.9 km || 
|-id=395 bgcolor=#E9E9E9
| 95395 ||  || — || February 10, 2002 || Socorro || LINEAR || — || align=right | 2.9 km || 
|-id=396 bgcolor=#E9E9E9
| 95396 ||  || — || February 10, 2002 || Socorro || LINEAR || HEN || align=right | 1.8 km || 
|-id=397 bgcolor=#E9E9E9
| 95397 ||  || — || February 10, 2002 || Socorro || LINEAR || HEN || align=right | 2.2 km || 
|-id=398 bgcolor=#E9E9E9
| 95398 ||  || — || February 10, 2002 || Socorro || LINEAR || ADE || align=right | 5.6 km || 
|-id=399 bgcolor=#fefefe
| 95399 ||  || — || February 10, 2002 || Socorro || LINEAR || — || align=right | 1.6 km || 
|-id=400 bgcolor=#E9E9E9
| 95400 ||  || — || February 10, 2002 || Socorro || LINEAR || — || align=right | 3.5 km || 
|}

95401–95500 

|-bgcolor=#E9E9E9
| 95401 ||  || — || February 10, 2002 || Socorro || LINEAR || — || align=right | 4.3 km || 
|-id=402 bgcolor=#d6d6d6
| 95402 ||  || — || February 10, 2002 || Socorro || LINEAR || THM || align=right | 6.1 km || 
|-id=403 bgcolor=#d6d6d6
| 95403 ||  || — || February 10, 2002 || Socorro || LINEAR || — || align=right | 4.7 km || 
|-id=404 bgcolor=#E9E9E9
| 95404 ||  || — || February 10, 2002 || Socorro || LINEAR || — || align=right | 3.8 km || 
|-id=405 bgcolor=#d6d6d6
| 95405 ||  || — || February 10, 2002 || Socorro || LINEAR || THM || align=right | 4.1 km || 
|-id=406 bgcolor=#E9E9E9
| 95406 ||  || — || February 10, 2002 || Socorro || LINEAR || WIT || align=right | 1.3 km || 
|-id=407 bgcolor=#E9E9E9
| 95407 ||  || — || February 10, 2002 || Socorro || LINEAR || — || align=right | 1.8 km || 
|-id=408 bgcolor=#d6d6d6
| 95408 ||  || — || February 10, 2002 || Socorro || LINEAR || KOR || align=right | 2.7 km || 
|-id=409 bgcolor=#d6d6d6
| 95409 ||  || — || February 10, 2002 || Socorro || LINEAR || — || align=right | 5.4 km || 
|-id=410 bgcolor=#d6d6d6
| 95410 ||  || — || February 10, 2002 || Socorro || LINEAR || — || align=right | 6.9 km || 
|-id=411 bgcolor=#d6d6d6
| 95411 ||  || — || February 10, 2002 || Socorro || LINEAR || — || align=right | 6.5 km || 
|-id=412 bgcolor=#d6d6d6
| 95412 ||  || — || February 10, 2002 || Socorro || LINEAR || — || align=right | 7.6 km || 
|-id=413 bgcolor=#E9E9E9
| 95413 ||  || — || February 10, 2002 || Socorro || LINEAR || EUN || align=right | 3.3 km || 
|-id=414 bgcolor=#d6d6d6
| 95414 ||  || — || February 10, 2002 || Socorro || LINEAR || — || align=right | 6.0 km || 
|-id=415 bgcolor=#E9E9E9
| 95415 ||  || — || February 10, 2002 || Socorro || LINEAR || — || align=right | 2.4 km || 
|-id=416 bgcolor=#d6d6d6
| 95416 ||  || — || February 10, 2002 || Socorro || LINEAR || — || align=right | 5.0 km || 
|-id=417 bgcolor=#d6d6d6
| 95417 ||  || — || February 10, 2002 || Socorro || LINEAR || — || align=right | 6.2 km || 
|-id=418 bgcolor=#E9E9E9
| 95418 ||  || — || February 11, 2002 || Socorro || LINEAR || — || align=right | 2.7 km || 
|-id=419 bgcolor=#E9E9E9
| 95419 ||  || — || February 11, 2002 || Socorro || LINEAR || — || align=right | 2.6 km || 
|-id=420 bgcolor=#E9E9E9
| 95420 ||  || — || February 5, 2002 || Palomar || NEAT || — || align=right | 4.7 km || 
|-id=421 bgcolor=#E9E9E9
| 95421 ||  || — || February 8, 2002 || Kitt Peak || Spacewatch || — || align=right | 3.9 km || 
|-id=422 bgcolor=#E9E9E9
| 95422 ||  || — || February 8, 2002 || Socorro || LINEAR || — || align=right | 4.1 km || 
|-id=423 bgcolor=#d6d6d6
| 95423 ||  || — || February 9, 2002 || Palomar || NEAT || EUP || align=right | 9.1 km || 
|-id=424 bgcolor=#d6d6d6
| 95424 ||  || — || February 8, 2002 || Socorro || LINEAR || — || align=right | 9.2 km || 
|-id=425 bgcolor=#d6d6d6
| 95425 ||  || — || February 10, 2002 || Socorro || LINEAR || — || align=right | 6.2 km || 
|-id=426 bgcolor=#d6d6d6
| 95426 ||  || — || February 10, 2002 || Socorro || LINEAR || — || align=right | 4.4 km || 
|-id=427 bgcolor=#d6d6d6
| 95427 ||  || — || February 10, 2002 || Socorro || LINEAR || — || align=right | 9.0 km || 
|-id=428 bgcolor=#fefefe
| 95428 ||  || — || February 11, 2002 || Socorro || LINEAR || — || align=right | 3.6 km || 
|-id=429 bgcolor=#E9E9E9
| 95429 ||  || — || February 11, 2002 || Socorro || LINEAR || WIT || align=right | 2.3 km || 
|-id=430 bgcolor=#d6d6d6
| 95430 ||  || — || February 11, 2002 || Socorro || LINEAR || — || align=right | 5.3 km || 
|-id=431 bgcolor=#d6d6d6
| 95431 ||  || — || February 11, 2002 || Socorro || LINEAR || KOR || align=right | 3.1 km || 
|-id=432 bgcolor=#E9E9E9
| 95432 ||  || — || February 11, 2002 || Socorro || LINEAR || — || align=right | 4.8 km || 
|-id=433 bgcolor=#fefefe
| 95433 ||  || — || February 11, 2002 || Socorro || LINEAR || — || align=right | 1.1 km || 
|-id=434 bgcolor=#d6d6d6
| 95434 ||  || — || February 11, 2002 || Socorro || LINEAR || — || align=right | 6.4 km || 
|-id=435 bgcolor=#fefefe
| 95435 ||  || — || February 11, 2002 || Socorro || LINEAR || NYS || align=right | 1.3 km || 
|-id=436 bgcolor=#d6d6d6
| 95436 ||  || — || February 11, 2002 || Socorro || LINEAR || URS || align=right | 7.5 km || 
|-id=437 bgcolor=#fefefe
| 95437 ||  || — || February 11, 2002 || Socorro || LINEAR || — || align=right | 1.6 km || 
|-id=438 bgcolor=#d6d6d6
| 95438 ||  || — || February 11, 2002 || Socorro || LINEAR || — || align=right | 8.7 km || 
|-id=439 bgcolor=#E9E9E9
| 95439 ||  || — || February 11, 2002 || Socorro || LINEAR || — || align=right | 2.6 km || 
|-id=440 bgcolor=#d6d6d6
| 95440 ||  || — || February 11, 2002 || Socorro || LINEAR || — || align=right | 8.1 km || 
|-id=441 bgcolor=#d6d6d6
| 95441 ||  || — || February 11, 2002 || Socorro || LINEAR || — || align=right | 6.3 km || 
|-id=442 bgcolor=#d6d6d6
| 95442 ||  || — || February 15, 2002 || Socorro || LINEAR || THM || align=right | 6.5 km || 
|-id=443 bgcolor=#d6d6d6
| 95443 ||  || — || February 15, 2002 || Socorro || LINEAR || — || align=right | 7.1 km || 
|-id=444 bgcolor=#E9E9E9
| 95444 ||  || — || February 14, 2002 || Palomar || NEAT || WIT || align=right | 2.0 km || 
|-id=445 bgcolor=#E9E9E9
| 95445 ||  || — || February 5, 2002 || Palomar || NEAT || — || align=right | 2.4 km || 
|-id=446 bgcolor=#d6d6d6
| 95446 ||  || — || February 6, 2002 || Anderson Mesa || LONEOS || — || align=right | 5.5 km || 
|-id=447 bgcolor=#E9E9E9
| 95447 ||  || — || February 6, 2002 || Palomar || NEAT || — || align=right | 3.7 km || 
|-id=448 bgcolor=#E9E9E9
| 95448 ||  || — || February 4, 2002 || Palomar || NEAT || — || align=right | 4.4 km || 
|-id=449 bgcolor=#E9E9E9
| 95449 Frederickgregory ||  ||  || February 7, 2002 || Kitt Peak || M. W. Buie || — || align=right | 2.8 km || 
|-id=450 bgcolor=#fefefe
| 95450 ||  || — || February 8, 2002 || Anderson Mesa || LONEOS || — || align=right | 2.0 km || 
|-id=451 bgcolor=#d6d6d6
| 95451 ||  || — || February 7, 2002 || Palomar || NEAT || — || align=right | 4.7 km || 
|-id=452 bgcolor=#E9E9E9
| 95452 ||  || — || February 7, 2002 || Haleakala || NEAT || — || align=right | 5.3 km || 
|-id=453 bgcolor=#E9E9E9
| 95453 ||  || — || February 9, 2002 || Kitt Peak || Spacewatch || — || align=right | 3.7 km || 
|-id=454 bgcolor=#E9E9E9
| 95454 ||  || — || February 10, 2002 || Socorro || LINEAR || EUN || align=right | 2.8 km || 
|-id=455 bgcolor=#d6d6d6
| 95455 ||  || — || February 10, 2002 || Anderson Mesa || LONEOS || — || align=right | 8.3 km || 
|-id=456 bgcolor=#d6d6d6
| 95456 ||  || — || February 11, 2002 || Socorro || LINEAR || EOS || align=right | 4.7 km || 
|-id=457 bgcolor=#d6d6d6
| 95457 ||  || — || February 12, 2002 || Socorro || LINEAR || MEL || align=right | 10 km || 
|-id=458 bgcolor=#E9E9E9
| 95458 ||  || — || February 8, 2002 || Socorro || LINEAR || — || align=right | 3.0 km || 
|-id=459 bgcolor=#fefefe
| 95459 ||  || — || February 8, 2002 || Socorro || LINEAR || V || align=right | 1.4 km || 
|-id=460 bgcolor=#fefefe
| 95460 || 2002 DR || — || February 17, 2002 || Oaxaca || J. M. Roe || NYS || align=right | 1.7 km || 
|-id=461 bgcolor=#d6d6d6
| 95461 ||  || — || February 21, 2002 || Fountain Hills || C. W. Juels, P. R. Holvorcem || ALA || align=right | 6.6 km || 
|-id=462 bgcolor=#E9E9E9
| 95462 ||  || — || February 16, 2002 || Haleakala || NEAT || — || align=right | 3.9 km || 
|-id=463 bgcolor=#E9E9E9
| 95463 ||  || — || February 16, 2002 || Kitt Peak || Spacewatch || — || align=right | 2.5 km || 
|-id=464 bgcolor=#E9E9E9
| 95464 ||  || — || February 19, 2002 || Socorro || LINEAR || — || align=right | 2.3 km || 
|-id=465 bgcolor=#d6d6d6
| 95465 ||  || — || February 19, 2002 || Socorro || LINEAR || EUP || align=right | 8.8 km || 
|-id=466 bgcolor=#d6d6d6
| 95466 ||  || — || February 19, 2002 || Socorro || LINEAR || THB || align=right | 7.6 km || 
|-id=467 bgcolor=#E9E9E9
| 95467 ||  || — || February 20, 2002 || Socorro || LINEAR || — || align=right | 2.6 km || 
|-id=468 bgcolor=#fefefe
| 95468 ||  || — || February 20, 2002 || Anderson Mesa || LONEOS || PHO || align=right | 2.9 km || 
|-id=469 bgcolor=#d6d6d6
| 95469 ||  || — || February 22, 2002 || Palomar || NEAT || CHA || align=right | 4.2 km || 
|-id=470 bgcolor=#E9E9E9
| 95470 ||  || — || February 20, 2002 || Socorro || LINEAR || — || align=right | 2.3 km || 
|-id=471 bgcolor=#E9E9E9
| 95471 || 2002 EE || — || March 3, 2002 || Farpoint || G. Hug || — || align=right | 4.6 km || 
|-id=472 bgcolor=#E9E9E9
| 95472 ||  || — || March 5, 2002 || Farpoint || Farpoint Obs. || — || align=right | 3.5 km || 
|-id=473 bgcolor=#E9E9E9
| 95473 ||  || — || March 6, 2002 || Socorro || LINEAR || — || align=right | 3.4 km || 
|-id=474 bgcolor=#E9E9E9
| 95474 Andreajbarbieri ||  ||  || March 10, 2002 || Cima Ekar || ADAS || — || align=right | 2.3 km || 
|-id=475 bgcolor=#d6d6d6
| 95475 ||  || — || March 10, 2002 || Cima Ekar || ADAS || — || align=right | 5.9 km || 
|-id=476 bgcolor=#E9E9E9
| 95476 ||  || — || March 11, 2002 || Palomar || NEAT || — || align=right | 3.1 km || 
|-id=477 bgcolor=#d6d6d6
| 95477 ||  || — || March 14, 2002 || Desert Eagle || W. K. Y. Yeung || — || align=right | 9.5 km || 
|-id=478 bgcolor=#d6d6d6
| 95478 ||  || — || March 14, 2002 || Desert Eagle || W. K. Y. Yeung || — || align=right | 7.6 km || 
|-id=479 bgcolor=#E9E9E9
| 95479 ||  || — || March 3, 2002 || Haleakala || NEAT || GEF || align=right | 2.6 km || 
|-id=480 bgcolor=#E9E9E9
| 95480 ||  || — || March 5, 2002 || Haleakala || NEAT || — || align=right | 2.0 km || 
|-id=481 bgcolor=#E9E9E9
| 95481 ||  || — || March 6, 2002 || Palomar || NEAT || GEF || align=right | 2.4 km || 
|-id=482 bgcolor=#d6d6d6
| 95482 ||  || — || March 6, 2002 || Palomar || NEAT || — || align=right | 5.0 km || 
|-id=483 bgcolor=#d6d6d6
| 95483 ||  || — || March 9, 2002 || Palomar || NEAT || — || align=right | 8.9 km || 
|-id=484 bgcolor=#E9E9E9
| 95484 ||  || — || March 10, 2002 || Haleakala || NEAT || HOF || align=right | 6.0 km || 
|-id=485 bgcolor=#d6d6d6
| 95485 ||  || — || March 10, 2002 || Haleakala || NEAT || — || align=right | 4.9 km || 
|-id=486 bgcolor=#E9E9E9
| 95486 ||  || — || March 5, 2002 || Kitt Peak || Spacewatch || — || align=right | 4.5 km || 
|-id=487 bgcolor=#d6d6d6
| 95487 ||  || — || March 5, 2002 || Kitt Peak || Spacewatch || — || align=right | 4.3 km || 
|-id=488 bgcolor=#d6d6d6
| 95488 ||  || — || March 10, 2002 || Anderson Mesa || LONEOS || KOR || align=right | 3.4 km || 
|-id=489 bgcolor=#E9E9E9
| 95489 ||  || — || March 9, 2002 || Socorro || LINEAR || — || align=right | 2.2 km || 
|-id=490 bgcolor=#d6d6d6
| 95490 ||  || — || March 9, 2002 || Socorro || LINEAR || — || align=right | 7.6 km || 
|-id=491 bgcolor=#E9E9E9
| 95491 ||  || — || March 9, 2002 || Socorro || LINEAR || — || align=right | 5.8 km || 
|-id=492 bgcolor=#E9E9E9
| 95492 ||  || — || March 9, 2002 || Socorro || LINEAR || — || align=right | 2.8 km || 
|-id=493 bgcolor=#E9E9E9
| 95493 ||  || — || March 9, 2002 || Socorro || LINEAR || MAR || align=right | 3.0 km || 
|-id=494 bgcolor=#d6d6d6
| 95494 ||  || — || March 11, 2002 || Socorro || LINEAR || — || align=right | 7.1 km || 
|-id=495 bgcolor=#d6d6d6
| 95495 ||  || — || March 10, 2002 || Haleakala || NEAT || — || align=right | 5.2 km || 
|-id=496 bgcolor=#E9E9E9
| 95496 ||  || — || March 11, 2002 || Palomar || NEAT || GEF || align=right | 2.7 km || 
|-id=497 bgcolor=#d6d6d6
| 95497 ||  || — || March 11, 2002 || Palomar || NEAT || URS || align=right | 6.5 km || 
|-id=498 bgcolor=#d6d6d6
| 95498 ||  || — || March 11, 2002 || Haleakala || NEAT || URS || align=right | 9.2 km || 
|-id=499 bgcolor=#d6d6d6
| 95499 ||  || — || March 10, 2002 || Kitt Peak || Spacewatch || — || align=right | 5.1 km || 
|-id=500 bgcolor=#E9E9E9
| 95500 ||  || — || March 11, 2002 || Socorro || LINEAR || — || align=right | 5.6 km || 
|}

95501–95600 

|-bgcolor=#d6d6d6
| 95501 ||  || — || March 11, 2002 || Socorro || LINEAR || — || align=right | 6.8 km || 
|-id=502 bgcolor=#E9E9E9
| 95502 ||  || — || March 12, 2002 || Socorro || LINEAR || HOF || align=right | 5.2 km || 
|-id=503 bgcolor=#d6d6d6
| 95503 ||  || — || March 12, 2002 || Socorro || LINEAR || HYG || align=right | 7.1 km || 
|-id=504 bgcolor=#E9E9E9
| 95504 ||  || — || March 10, 2002 || Haleakala || NEAT || WIT || align=right | 2.0 km || 
|-id=505 bgcolor=#d6d6d6
| 95505 ||  || — || March 11, 2002 || Palomar || NEAT || VER || align=right | 5.6 km || 
|-id=506 bgcolor=#d6d6d6
| 95506 ||  || — || March 12, 2002 || Palomar || NEAT || — || align=right | 3.5 km || 
|-id=507 bgcolor=#d6d6d6
| 95507 ||  || — || March 12, 2002 || Palomar || NEAT || — || align=right | 5.4 km || 
|-id=508 bgcolor=#d6d6d6
| 95508 ||  || — || March 12, 2002 || Palomar || NEAT || — || align=right | 4.1 km || 
|-id=509 bgcolor=#d6d6d6
| 95509 ||  || — || March 12, 2002 || Palomar || NEAT || — || align=right | 4.9 km || 
|-id=510 bgcolor=#E9E9E9
| 95510 ||  || — || March 12, 2002 || Kitt Peak || Spacewatch || HEN || align=right | 2.0 km || 
|-id=511 bgcolor=#E9E9E9
| 95511 ||  || — || March 9, 2002 || Socorro || LINEAR || — || align=right | 4.5 km || 
|-id=512 bgcolor=#E9E9E9
| 95512 ||  || — || March 9, 2002 || Socorro || LINEAR || — || align=right | 3.7 km || 
|-id=513 bgcolor=#E9E9E9
| 95513 ||  || — || March 9, 2002 || Socorro || LINEAR || PAD || align=right | 3.7 km || 
|-id=514 bgcolor=#E9E9E9
| 95514 ||  || — || March 9, 2002 || Socorro || LINEAR || — || align=right | 4.8 km || 
|-id=515 bgcolor=#d6d6d6
| 95515 ||  || — || March 13, 2002 || Socorro || LINEAR || KOR || align=right | 2.8 km || 
|-id=516 bgcolor=#E9E9E9
| 95516 ||  || — || March 13, 2002 || Socorro || LINEAR || PAD || align=right | 4.4 km || 
|-id=517 bgcolor=#E9E9E9
| 95517 ||  || — || March 13, 2002 || Socorro || LINEAR || — || align=right | 3.6 km || 
|-id=518 bgcolor=#d6d6d6
| 95518 ||  || — || March 13, 2002 || Socorro || LINEAR || LUT || align=right | 7.5 km || 
|-id=519 bgcolor=#E9E9E9
| 95519 ||  || — || March 13, 2002 || Socorro || LINEAR || — || align=right | 4.1 km || 
|-id=520 bgcolor=#E9E9E9
| 95520 ||  || — || March 13, 2002 || Socorro || LINEAR || — || align=right | 2.6 km || 
|-id=521 bgcolor=#d6d6d6
| 95521 ||  || — || March 13, 2002 || Socorro || LINEAR || KOR || align=right | 2.8 km || 
|-id=522 bgcolor=#E9E9E9
| 95522 ||  || — || March 13, 2002 || Socorro || LINEAR || — || align=right | 3.4 km || 
|-id=523 bgcolor=#d6d6d6
| 95523 ||  || — || March 13, 2002 || Socorro || LINEAR || — || align=right | 6.6 km || 
|-id=524 bgcolor=#E9E9E9
| 95524 ||  || — || March 13, 2002 || Socorro || LINEAR || — || align=right | 4.7 km || 
|-id=525 bgcolor=#E9E9E9
| 95525 ||  || — || March 13, 2002 || Socorro || LINEAR || — || align=right | 4.9 km || 
|-id=526 bgcolor=#d6d6d6
| 95526 ||  || — || March 13, 2002 || Socorro || LINEAR || HYG || align=right | 5.5 km || 
|-id=527 bgcolor=#d6d6d6
| 95527 ||  || — || March 13, 2002 || Socorro || LINEAR || — || align=right | 5.5 km || 
|-id=528 bgcolor=#E9E9E9
| 95528 ||  || — || March 13, 2002 || Socorro || LINEAR || — || align=right | 3.6 km || 
|-id=529 bgcolor=#d6d6d6
| 95529 ||  || — || March 13, 2002 || Socorro || LINEAR || — || align=right | 5.0 km || 
|-id=530 bgcolor=#d6d6d6
| 95530 ||  || — || March 13, 2002 || Socorro || LINEAR || 7:4 || align=right | 7.4 km || 
|-id=531 bgcolor=#fefefe
| 95531 ||  || — || March 14, 2002 || Palomar || NEAT || — || align=right | 1.5 km || 
|-id=532 bgcolor=#d6d6d6
| 95532 ||  || — || March 14, 2002 || Palomar || NEAT || VER || align=right | 5.9 km || 
|-id=533 bgcolor=#E9E9E9
| 95533 ||  || — || March 14, 2002 || Palomar || NEAT || AEO || align=right | 1.9 km || 
|-id=534 bgcolor=#E9E9E9
| 95534 ||  || — || March 11, 2002 || Kitt Peak || Spacewatch || INO || align=right | 3.4 km || 
|-id=535 bgcolor=#d6d6d6
| 95535 ||  || — || March 13, 2002 || Palomar || NEAT || EOS || align=right | 3.5 km || 
|-id=536 bgcolor=#E9E9E9
| 95536 ||  || — || March 13, 2002 || Palomar || NEAT || — || align=right | 3.7 km || 
|-id=537 bgcolor=#d6d6d6
| 95537 ||  || — || March 9, 2002 || Socorro || LINEAR || — || align=right | 5.7 km || 
|-id=538 bgcolor=#d6d6d6
| 95538 ||  || — || March 9, 2002 || Socorro || LINEAR || HYG || align=right | 4.1 km || 
|-id=539 bgcolor=#E9E9E9
| 95539 ||  || — || March 9, 2002 || Socorro || LINEAR || — || align=right | 3.4 km || 
|-id=540 bgcolor=#d6d6d6
| 95540 ||  || — || March 9, 2002 || Socorro || LINEAR || — || align=right | 5.1 km || 
|-id=541 bgcolor=#d6d6d6
| 95541 ||  || — || March 9, 2002 || Socorro || LINEAR || — || align=right | 4.7 km || 
|-id=542 bgcolor=#d6d6d6
| 95542 ||  || — || March 9, 2002 || Socorro || LINEAR || ALA || align=right | 8.4 km || 
|-id=543 bgcolor=#d6d6d6
| 95543 ||  || — || March 9, 2002 || Socorro || LINEAR || — || align=right | 7.8 km || 
|-id=544 bgcolor=#E9E9E9
| 95544 ||  || — || March 9, 2002 || Socorro || LINEAR || — || align=right | 2.6 km || 
|-id=545 bgcolor=#d6d6d6
| 95545 ||  || — || March 9, 2002 || Socorro || LINEAR || — || align=right | 5.6 km || 
|-id=546 bgcolor=#d6d6d6
| 95546 ||  || — || March 9, 2002 || Socorro || LINEAR || KOR || align=right | 3.0 km || 
|-id=547 bgcolor=#E9E9E9
| 95547 ||  || — || March 9, 2002 || Socorro || LINEAR || — || align=right | 2.5 km || 
|-id=548 bgcolor=#E9E9E9
| 95548 ||  || — || March 9, 2002 || Socorro || LINEAR || — || align=right | 2.5 km || 
|-id=549 bgcolor=#d6d6d6
| 95549 ||  || — || March 12, 2002 || Socorro || LINEAR || HYG || align=right | 7.5 km || 
|-id=550 bgcolor=#d6d6d6
| 95550 ||  || — || March 12, 2002 || Socorro || LINEAR || — || align=right | 7.1 km || 
|-id=551 bgcolor=#d6d6d6
| 95551 ||  || — || March 14, 2002 || Socorro || LINEAR || — || align=right | 4.9 km || 
|-id=552 bgcolor=#E9E9E9
| 95552 ||  || — || March 14, 2002 || Socorro || LINEAR || PAD || align=right | 4.5 km || 
|-id=553 bgcolor=#E9E9E9
| 95553 ||  || — || March 14, 2002 || Socorro || LINEAR || PAD || align=right | 3.4 km || 
|-id=554 bgcolor=#d6d6d6
| 95554 ||  || — || March 14, 2002 || Socorro || LINEAR || — || align=right | 5.5 km || 
|-id=555 bgcolor=#d6d6d6
| 95555 ||  || — || March 14, 2002 || Palomar || NEAT || — || align=right | 6.3 km || 
|-id=556 bgcolor=#d6d6d6
| 95556 ||  || — || March 14, 2002 || Palomar || NEAT || EOS || align=right | 4.1 km || 
|-id=557 bgcolor=#E9E9E9
| 95557 ||  || — || March 14, 2002 || Palomar || NEAT || — || align=right | 6.9 km || 
|-id=558 bgcolor=#d6d6d6
| 95558 ||  || — || March 11, 2002 || Socorro || LINEAR || EUP || align=right | 9.9 km || 
|-id=559 bgcolor=#E9E9E9
| 95559 ||  || — || March 12, 2002 || Socorro || LINEAR || — || align=right | 5.3 km || 
|-id=560 bgcolor=#E9E9E9
| 95560 ||  || — || March 15, 2002 || Socorro || LINEAR || — || align=right | 3.9 km || 
|-id=561 bgcolor=#d6d6d6
| 95561 ||  || — || March 5, 2002 || Haleakala || NEAT || EOS || align=right | 3.9 km || 
|-id=562 bgcolor=#E9E9E9
| 95562 ||  || — || March 6, 2002 || Socorro || LINEAR || — || align=right | 4.7 km || 
|-id=563 bgcolor=#d6d6d6
| 95563 ||  || — || March 6, 2002 || Socorro || LINEAR || — || align=right | 6.6 km || 
|-id=564 bgcolor=#E9E9E9
| 95564 ||  || — || March 6, 2002 || Catalina || CSS || — || align=right | 5.1 km || 
|-id=565 bgcolor=#d6d6d6
| 95565 ||  || — || March 9, 2002 || Anderson Mesa || LONEOS || — || align=right | 6.8 km || 
|-id=566 bgcolor=#d6d6d6
| 95566 ||  || — || March 9, 2002 || Palomar || NEAT || — || align=right | 4.7 km || 
|-id=567 bgcolor=#d6d6d6
| 95567 ||  || — || March 9, 2002 || Palomar || NEAT || THM || align=right | 5.5 km || 
|-id=568 bgcolor=#d6d6d6
| 95568 ||  || — || March 9, 2002 || Kitt Peak || Spacewatch || — || align=right | 4.5 km || 
|-id=569 bgcolor=#C2FFFF
| 95569 ||  || — || March 10, 2002 || Kitt Peak || Spacewatch || L4 || align=right | 14 km || 
|-id=570 bgcolor=#d6d6d6
| 95570 ||  || — || March 10, 2002 || Anderson Mesa || LONEOS || — || align=right | 4.9 km || 
|-id=571 bgcolor=#d6d6d6
| 95571 ||  || — || March 12, 2002 || Palomar || NEAT || EOS || align=right | 3.5 km || 
|-id=572 bgcolor=#d6d6d6
| 95572 ||  || — || March 12, 2002 || Anderson Mesa || LONEOS || TIR || align=right | 8.2 km || 
|-id=573 bgcolor=#E9E9E9
| 95573 ||  || — || March 12, 2002 || Palomar || NEAT || HEN || align=right | 1.9 km || 
|-id=574 bgcolor=#E9E9E9
| 95574 ||  || — || March 12, 2002 || Palomar || NEAT || — || align=right | 3.1 km || 
|-id=575 bgcolor=#d6d6d6
| 95575 ||  || — || March 12, 2002 || Palomar || NEAT || — || align=right | 5.3 km || 
|-id=576 bgcolor=#d6d6d6
| 95576 ||  || — || March 12, 2002 || Palomar || NEAT || — || align=right | 4.7 km || 
|-id=577 bgcolor=#E9E9E9
| 95577 ||  || — || March 14, 2002 || Palomar || NEAT || EUN || align=right | 4.1 km || 
|-id=578 bgcolor=#fefefe
| 95578 ||  || — || March 14, 2002 || Palomar || NEAT || — || align=right | 1.9 km || 
|-id=579 bgcolor=#d6d6d6
| 95579 ||  || — || March 15, 2002 || Palomar || NEAT || — || align=right | 5.9 km || 
|-id=580 bgcolor=#d6d6d6
| 95580 ||  || — || March 15, 2002 || Palomar || NEAT || EOS || align=right | 4.6 km || 
|-id=581 bgcolor=#d6d6d6
| 95581 ||  || — || March 15, 2002 || Palomar || NEAT || — || align=right | 4.7 km || 
|-id=582 bgcolor=#d6d6d6
| 95582 ||  || — || March 15, 2002 || Palomar || NEAT || — || align=right | 6.2 km || 
|-id=583 bgcolor=#E9E9E9
| 95583 ||  || — || March 9, 2002 || Anderson Mesa || LONEOS || WIT || align=right | 1.9 km || 
|-id=584 bgcolor=#E9E9E9
| 95584 ||  || — || March 19, 2002 || Desert Eagle || W. K. Y. Yeung || AGN || align=right | 3.0 km || 
|-id=585 bgcolor=#d6d6d6
| 95585 ||  || — || March 20, 2002 || Desert Eagle || W. K. Y. Yeung || — || align=right | 7.8 km || 
|-id=586 bgcolor=#d6d6d6
| 95586 ||  || — || March 16, 2002 || Socorro || LINEAR || — || align=right | 6.1 km || 
|-id=587 bgcolor=#E9E9E9
| 95587 ||  || — || March 16, 2002 || Socorro || LINEAR || GEF || align=right | 2.6 km || 
|-id=588 bgcolor=#d6d6d6
| 95588 ||  || — || March 16, 2002 || Socorro || LINEAR || — || align=right | 6.4 km || 
|-id=589 bgcolor=#d6d6d6
| 95589 ||  || — || March 16, 2002 || Socorro || LINEAR || — || align=right | 6.6 km || 
|-id=590 bgcolor=#E9E9E9
| 95590 ||  || — || March 16, 2002 || Socorro || LINEAR || BRU || align=right | 6.6 km || 
|-id=591 bgcolor=#E9E9E9
| 95591 ||  || — || March 16, 2002 || Socorro || LINEAR || EUN || align=right | 2.1 km || 
|-id=592 bgcolor=#d6d6d6
| 95592 ||  || — || March 17, 2002 || Socorro || LINEAR || — || align=right | 6.5 km || 
|-id=593 bgcolor=#d6d6d6
| 95593 Azusienis ||  ||  || March 16, 2002 || Moletai || K. Černis, J. Zdanavičius || URS || align=right | 6.3 km || 
|-id=594 bgcolor=#d6d6d6
| 95594 ||  || — || March 16, 2002 || Haleakala || NEAT || — || align=right | 9.2 km || 
|-id=595 bgcolor=#d6d6d6
| 95595 ||  || — || March 16, 2002 || Haleakala || NEAT || — || align=right | 8.4 km || 
|-id=596 bgcolor=#d6d6d6
| 95596 ||  || — || March 16, 2002 || Haleakala || NEAT || ALA || align=right | 7.6 km || 
|-id=597 bgcolor=#E9E9E9
| 95597 ||  || — || March 19, 2002 || Anderson Mesa || LONEOS || WAT || align=right | 4.1 km || 
|-id=598 bgcolor=#fefefe
| 95598 ||  || — || March 19, 2002 || Palomar || NEAT || PHO || align=right | 2.1 km || 
|-id=599 bgcolor=#d6d6d6
| 95599 ||  || — || March 20, 2002 || Socorro || LINEAR || EOS || align=right | 4.4 km || 
|-id=600 bgcolor=#d6d6d6
| 95600 ||  || — || March 20, 2002 || Socorro || LINEAR || — || align=right | 6.0 km || 
|}

95601–95700 

|-bgcolor=#d6d6d6
| 95601 ||  || — || March 20, 2002 || Palomar || NEAT || EOS || align=right | 4.2 km || 
|-id=602 bgcolor=#d6d6d6
| 95602 ||  || — || March 20, 2002 || Socorro || LINEAR || EUP || align=right | 9.8 km || 
|-id=603 bgcolor=#d6d6d6
| 95603 ||  || — || March 20, 2002 || Socorro || LINEAR || — || align=right | 6.7 km || 
|-id=604 bgcolor=#d6d6d6
| 95604 ||  || — || March 20, 2002 || Socorro || LINEAR || — || align=right | 5.3 km || 
|-id=605 bgcolor=#d6d6d6
| 95605 ||  || — || March 20, 2002 || Socorro || LINEAR || EOS || align=right | 4.0 km || 
|-id=606 bgcolor=#d6d6d6
| 95606 ||  || — || March 20, 2002 || Palomar || NEAT || — || align=right | 6.8 km || 
|-id=607 bgcolor=#d6d6d6
| 95607 ||  || — || March 20, 2002 || Anderson Mesa || LONEOS || — || align=right | 6.4 km || 
|-id=608 bgcolor=#E9E9E9
| 95608 ||  || — || March 20, 2002 || Anderson Mesa || LONEOS || XIZ || align=right | 2.9 km || 
|-id=609 bgcolor=#E9E9E9
| 95609 ||  || — || March 20, 2002 || Anderson Mesa || LONEOS || — || align=right | 3.1 km || 
|-id=610 bgcolor=#E9E9E9
| 95610 ||  || — || March 20, 2002 || Anderson Mesa || LONEOS || GEF || align=right | 2.5 km || 
|-id=611 bgcolor=#d6d6d6
| 95611 ||  || — || March 20, 2002 || Anderson Mesa || LONEOS || — || align=right | 6.2 km || 
|-id=612 bgcolor=#d6d6d6
| 95612 ||  || — || March 20, 2002 || Kitt Peak || Spacewatch || — || align=right | 5.2 km || 
|-id=613 bgcolor=#E9E9E9
| 95613 ||  || — || March 30, 2002 || Palomar || NEAT || WIT || align=right | 3.1 km || 
|-id=614 bgcolor=#d6d6d6
| 95614 ||  || — || March 31, 2002 || Palomar || NEAT || — || align=right | 6.5 km || 
|-id=615 bgcolor=#d6d6d6
| 95615 ||  || — || March 31, 2002 || Palomar || NEAT || — || align=right | 6.9 km || 
|-id=616 bgcolor=#E9E9E9
| 95616 ||  || — || April 14, 2002 || Desert Eagle || W. K. Y. Yeung || — || align=right | 1.8 km || 
|-id=617 bgcolor=#E9E9E9
| 95617 ||  || — || April 14, 2002 || Desert Eagle || W. K. Y. Yeung || — || align=right | 3.9 km || 
|-id=618 bgcolor=#d6d6d6
| 95618 ||  || — || April 14, 2002 || Desert Eagle || W. K. Y. Yeung || — || align=right | 8.5 km || 
|-id=619 bgcolor=#d6d6d6
| 95619 ||  || — || April 14, 2002 || Desert Eagle || W. K. Y. Yeung || — || align=right | 6.1 km || 
|-id=620 bgcolor=#E9E9E9
| 95620 ||  || — || April 14, 2002 || Desert Eagle || W. K. Y. Yeung || — || align=right | 6.9 km || 
|-id=621 bgcolor=#E9E9E9
| 95621 ||  || — || April 15, 2002 || Socorro || LINEAR || HNS || align=right | 5.9 km || 
|-id=622 bgcolor=#d6d6d6
| 95622 ||  || — || April 14, 2002 || Socorro || LINEAR || EOS || align=right | 5.1 km || 
|-id=623 bgcolor=#E9E9E9
| 95623 ||  || — || April 15, 2002 || Palomar || NEAT || — || align=right | 1.8 km || 
|-id=624 bgcolor=#E9E9E9
| 95624 ||  || — || April 13, 2002 || Kitt Peak || Spacewatch || — || align=right | 2.1 km || 
|-id=625 bgcolor=#C2E0FF
| 95625 ||  || — || April 8, 2002 || Cerro Tololo || M. W. Buie, A. B. Jordan, J. L. Elliot || res3:7critical || align=right | 147 km || 
|-id=626 bgcolor=#C7FF8F
| 95626 ||  || — || April 13, 2002 || Mauna Kea || Mauna Kea Obs. || centaur || align=right | 231 km || 
|-id=627 bgcolor=#E9E9E9
| 95627 ||  || — || April 1, 2002 || Palomar || NEAT || — || align=right | 2.5 km || 
|-id=628 bgcolor=#d6d6d6
| 95628 ||  || — || April 2, 2002 || Palomar || NEAT || TIR || align=right | 7.1 km || 
|-id=629 bgcolor=#d6d6d6
| 95629 ||  || — || April 2, 2002 || Kitt Peak || Spacewatch || — || align=right | 8.1 km || 
|-id=630 bgcolor=#d6d6d6
| 95630 ||  || — || April 2, 2002 || Kitt Peak || Spacewatch || — || align=right | 4.7 km || 
|-id=631 bgcolor=#E9E9E9
| 95631 ||  || — || April 3, 2002 || Kitt Peak || Spacewatch || HEN || align=right | 1.7 km || 
|-id=632 bgcolor=#d6d6d6
| 95632 ||  || — || April 4, 2002 || Palomar || NEAT || — || align=right | 4.8 km || 
|-id=633 bgcolor=#d6d6d6
| 95633 ||  || — || April 4, 2002 || Palomar || NEAT || EOS || align=right | 3.4 km || 
|-id=634 bgcolor=#E9E9E9
| 95634 ||  || — || April 4, 2002 || Haleakala || NEAT || AER || align=right | 2.7 km || 
|-id=635 bgcolor=#d6d6d6
| 95635 ||  || — || April 5, 2002 || Anderson Mesa || LONEOS || — || align=right | 5.0 km || 
|-id=636 bgcolor=#d6d6d6
| 95636 ||  || — || April 5, 2002 || Palomar || NEAT || EOS || align=right | 3.8 km || 
|-id=637 bgcolor=#E9E9E9
| 95637 ||  || — || April 5, 2002 || Anderson Mesa || LONEOS || — || align=right | 4.6 km || 
|-id=638 bgcolor=#d6d6d6
| 95638 ||  || — || April 8, 2002 || Palomar || NEAT || THM || align=right | 4.6 km || 
|-id=639 bgcolor=#d6d6d6
| 95639 ||  || — || April 8, 2002 || Kitt Peak || Spacewatch || — || align=right | 4.0 km || 
|-id=640 bgcolor=#d6d6d6
| 95640 ||  || — || April 10, 2002 || Socorro || LINEAR || EOS || align=right | 5.2 km || 
|-id=641 bgcolor=#d6d6d6
| 95641 ||  || — || April 10, 2002 || Socorro || LINEAR || — || align=right | 6.0 km || 
|-id=642 bgcolor=#d6d6d6
| 95642 ||  || — || April 10, 2002 || Socorro || LINEAR || VER || align=right | 6.4 km || 
|-id=643 bgcolor=#d6d6d6
| 95643 ||  || — || April 10, 2002 || Socorro || LINEAR || — || align=right | 5.5 km || 
|-id=644 bgcolor=#E9E9E9
| 95644 ||  || — || April 10, 2002 || Socorro || LINEAR || GEF || align=right | 2.8 km || 
|-id=645 bgcolor=#d6d6d6
| 95645 ||  || — || April 10, 2002 || Socorro || LINEAR || — || align=right | 5.9 km || 
|-id=646 bgcolor=#E9E9E9
| 95646 ||  || — || April 9, 2002 || Socorro || LINEAR || GEF || align=right | 3.1 km || 
|-id=647 bgcolor=#d6d6d6
| 95647 ||  || — || April 9, 2002 || Socorro || LINEAR || — || align=right | 10 km || 
|-id=648 bgcolor=#d6d6d6
| 95648 ||  || — || April 10, 2002 || Socorro || LINEAR || — || align=right | 6.4 km || 
|-id=649 bgcolor=#d6d6d6
| 95649 ||  || — || April 10, 2002 || Socorro || LINEAR || — || align=right | 6.6 km || 
|-id=650 bgcolor=#d6d6d6
| 95650 ||  || — || April 10, 2002 || Socorro || LINEAR || EOS || align=right | 4.1 km || 
|-id=651 bgcolor=#d6d6d6
| 95651 ||  || — || April 10, 2002 || Socorro || LINEAR || HYG || align=right | 5.8 km || 
|-id=652 bgcolor=#d6d6d6
| 95652 ||  || — || April 10, 2002 || Socorro || LINEAR || ALA || align=right | 8.3 km || 
|-id=653 bgcolor=#d6d6d6
| 95653 ||  || — || April 11, 2002 || Anderson Mesa || LONEOS || NAE || align=right | 5.2 km || 
|-id=654 bgcolor=#E9E9E9
| 95654 ||  || — || April 11, 2002 || Socorro || LINEAR || HOF || align=right | 5.5 km || 
|-id=655 bgcolor=#d6d6d6
| 95655 ||  || — || April 11, 2002 || Socorro || LINEAR || — || align=right | 6.2 km || 
|-id=656 bgcolor=#d6d6d6
| 95656 ||  || — || April 11, 2002 || Palomar || NEAT || — || align=right | 5.9 km || 
|-id=657 bgcolor=#d6d6d6
| 95657 ||  || — || April 9, 2002 || Socorro || LINEAR || EOS || align=right | 4.0 km || 
|-id=658 bgcolor=#d6d6d6
| 95658 ||  || — || April 11, 2002 || Socorro || LINEAR || — || align=right | 5.6 km || 
|-id=659 bgcolor=#E9E9E9
| 95659 ||  || — || April 10, 2002 || Socorro || LINEAR || — || align=right | 2.7 km || 
|-id=660 bgcolor=#E9E9E9
| 95660 ||  || — || April 12, 2002 || Socorro || LINEAR || — || align=right | 4.6 km || 
|-id=661 bgcolor=#E9E9E9
| 95661 ||  || — || April 12, 2002 || Socorro || LINEAR || MRX || align=right | 2.0 km || 
|-id=662 bgcolor=#E9E9E9
| 95662 ||  || — || April 12, 2002 || Socorro || LINEAR || — || align=right | 3.6 km || 
|-id=663 bgcolor=#E9E9E9
| 95663 ||  || — || April 12, 2002 || Socorro || LINEAR || — || align=right | 2.1 km || 
|-id=664 bgcolor=#d6d6d6
| 95664 ||  || — || April 12, 2002 || Socorro || LINEAR || — || align=right | 5.7 km || 
|-id=665 bgcolor=#d6d6d6
| 95665 ||  || — || April 13, 2002 || Needville || Needville Obs. || — || align=right | 4.4 km || 
|-id=666 bgcolor=#E9E9E9
| 95666 ||  || — || April 13, 2002 || Palomar || NEAT || — || align=right | 5.0 km || 
|-id=667 bgcolor=#E9E9E9
| 95667 ||  || — || April 13, 2002 || Palomar || NEAT || — || align=right | 4.0 km || 
|-id=668 bgcolor=#E9E9E9
| 95668 ||  || — || April 15, 2002 || Palomar || NEAT || — || align=right | 4.2 km || 
|-id=669 bgcolor=#d6d6d6
| 95669 ||  || — || April 15, 2002 || Anderson Mesa || LONEOS || URS || align=right | 8.3 km || 
|-id=670 bgcolor=#d6d6d6
| 95670 ||  || — || April 14, 2002 || Anderson Mesa || LONEOS || — || align=right | 8.0 km || 
|-id=671 bgcolor=#d6d6d6
| 95671 ||  || — || April 14, 2002 || Kitt Peak || Spacewatch || — || align=right | 5.5 km || 
|-id=672 bgcolor=#d6d6d6
| 95672 ||  || — || April 10, 2002 || Socorro || LINEAR || — || align=right | 9.3 km || 
|-id=673 bgcolor=#d6d6d6
| 95673 ||  || — || April 10, 2002 || Socorro || LINEAR || — || align=right | 4.6 km || 
|-id=674 bgcolor=#d6d6d6
| 95674 ||  || — || April 10, 2002 || Socorro || LINEAR || — || align=right | 7.2 km || 
|-id=675 bgcolor=#E9E9E9
| 95675 ||  || — || April 10, 2002 || Socorro || LINEAR || — || align=right | 2.0 km || 
|-id=676 bgcolor=#d6d6d6
| 95676 ||  || — || April 11, 2002 || Socorro || LINEAR || — || align=right | 7.9 km || 
|-id=677 bgcolor=#fefefe
| 95677 ||  || — || April 12, 2002 || Palomar || M. White, M. Collins || — || align=right | 1.7 km || 
|-id=678 bgcolor=#d6d6d6
| 95678 || 2002 HM || — || April 16, 2002 || Desert Eagle || W. K. Y. Yeung || — || align=right | 6.2 km || 
|-id=679 bgcolor=#d6d6d6
| 95679 || 2002 HX || — || April 16, 2002 || Socorro || LINEAR || — || align=right | 9.7 km || 
|-id=680 bgcolor=#E9E9E9
| 95680 ||  || — || April 16, 2002 || Socorro || LINEAR || HOF || align=right | 6.3 km || 
|-id=681 bgcolor=#d6d6d6
| 95681 ||  || — || April 17, 2002 || Socorro || LINEAR || EOS || align=right | 4.4 km || 
|-id=682 bgcolor=#d6d6d6
| 95682 ||  || — || April 19, 2002 || Kitt Peak || Spacewatch || — || align=right | 4.0 km || 
|-id=683 bgcolor=#d6d6d6
| 95683 || 2002 JA || — || May 2, 2002 || Siding Spring || R. H. McNaught || — || align=right | 4.3 km || 
|-id=684 bgcolor=#E9E9E9
| 95684 ||  || — || May 7, 2002 || Socorro || LINEAR || — || align=right | 2.9 km || 
|-id=685 bgcolor=#d6d6d6
| 95685 ||  || — || May 8, 2002 || Haleakala || NEAT || URS || align=right | 6.5 km || 
|-id=686 bgcolor=#d6d6d6
| 95686 ||  || — || May 6, 2002 || Socorro || LINEAR || — || align=right | 7.6 km || 
|-id=687 bgcolor=#E9E9E9
| 95687 ||  || — || May 8, 2002 || Socorro || LINEAR || PAE || align=right | 4.0 km || 
|-id=688 bgcolor=#d6d6d6
| 95688 ||  || — || May 8, 2002 || Socorro || LINEAR || — || align=right | 8.8 km || 
|-id=689 bgcolor=#E9E9E9
| 95689 ||  || — || May 8, 2002 || Socorro || LINEAR || HNS || align=right | 3.6 km || 
|-id=690 bgcolor=#d6d6d6
| 95690 ||  || — || May 9, 2002 || Socorro || LINEAR || — || align=right | 6.3 km || 
|-id=691 bgcolor=#d6d6d6
| 95691 ||  || — || May 9, 2002 || Socorro || LINEAR || THM || align=right | 4.5 km || 
|-id=692 bgcolor=#E9E9E9
| 95692 ||  || — || May 8, 2002 || Socorro || LINEAR || ADE || align=right | 6.6 km || 
|-id=693 bgcolor=#d6d6d6
| 95693 ||  || — || May 7, 2002 || Socorro || LINEAR || — || align=right | 9.3 km || 
|-id=694 bgcolor=#E9E9E9
| 95694 ||  || — || May 8, 2002 || Socorro || LINEAR || HNS || align=right | 3.3 km || 
|-id=695 bgcolor=#d6d6d6
| 95695 ||  || — || May 8, 2002 || Socorro || LINEAR || — || align=right | 8.2 km || 
|-id=696 bgcolor=#FA8072
| 95696 ||  || — || May 11, 2002 || Socorro || LINEAR || — || align=right | 3.1 km || 
|-id=697 bgcolor=#d6d6d6
| 95697 ||  || — || May 11, 2002 || Socorro || LINEAR || — || align=right | 5.8 km || 
|-id=698 bgcolor=#E9E9E9
| 95698 ||  || — || May 11, 2002 || Socorro || LINEAR || EUN || align=right | 3.6 km || 
|-id=699 bgcolor=#d6d6d6
| 95699 ||  || — || May 11, 2002 || Socorro || LINEAR || VER || align=right | 5.5 km || 
|-id=700 bgcolor=#d6d6d6
| 95700 ||  || — || May 11, 2002 || Socorro || LINEAR || — || align=right | 4.2 km || 
|}

95701–95800 

|-bgcolor=#d6d6d6
| 95701 ||  || — || May 11, 2002 || Socorro || LINEAR || — || align=right | 8.6 km || 
|-id=702 bgcolor=#E9E9E9
| 95702 ||  || — || May 13, 2002 || Socorro || LINEAR || — || align=right | 8.4 km || 
|-id=703 bgcolor=#d6d6d6
| 95703 ||  || — || May 6, 2002 || Palomar || NEAT || — || align=right | 6.9 km || 
|-id=704 bgcolor=#E9E9E9
| 95704 ||  || — || May 6, 2002 || Palomar || NEAT || slow || align=right | 4.3 km || 
|-id=705 bgcolor=#d6d6d6
| 95705 ||  || — || May 9, 2002 || Socorro || LINEAR || — || align=right | 6.5 km || 
|-id=706 bgcolor=#d6d6d6
| 95706 ||  || — || May 9, 2002 || Socorro || LINEAR || EOS || align=right | 4.1 km || 
|-id=707 bgcolor=#E9E9E9
| 95707 ||  || — || May 16, 2002 || Socorro || LINEAR || HNS || align=right | 2.5 km || 
|-id=708 bgcolor=#E9E9E9
| 95708 ||  || — || May 17, 2002 || Palomar || NEAT || HOF || align=right | 6.9 km || 
|-id=709 bgcolor=#d6d6d6
| 95709 ||  || — || June 3, 2002 || Socorro || LINEAR || EUP || align=right | 6.8 km || 
|-id=710 bgcolor=#fefefe
| 95710 ||  || — || October 31, 2002 || Needville || Needville Obs. || — || align=right | 1.5 km || 
|-id=711 bgcolor=#FA8072
| 95711 || 2003 AK || — || January 1, 2003 || Socorro || LINEAR || slow? || align=right | 2.6 km || 
|-id=712 bgcolor=#fefefe
| 95712 ||  || — || January 2, 2003 || Socorro || LINEAR || H || align=right | 1.3 km || 
|-id=713 bgcolor=#E9E9E9
| 95713 ||  || — || January 5, 2003 || Socorro || LINEAR || — || align=right | 3.8 km || 
|-id=714 bgcolor=#E9E9E9
| 95714 ||  || — || January 12, 2003 || Kitt Peak || Spacewatch || — || align=right | 2.7 km || 
|-id=715 bgcolor=#fefefe
| 95715 ||  || — || January 26, 2003 || Haleakala || NEAT || — || align=right | 2.0 km || 
|-id=716 bgcolor=#fefefe
| 95716 ||  || — || January 27, 2003 || Socorro || LINEAR || — || align=right | 3.8 km || 
|-id=717 bgcolor=#E9E9E9
| 95717 ||  || — || January 25, 2003 || Palomar || NEAT || — || align=right | 2.1 km || 
|-id=718 bgcolor=#fefefe
| 95718 ||  || — || January 26, 2003 || Anderson Mesa || LONEOS || — || align=right | 1.3 km || 
|-id=719 bgcolor=#fefefe
| 95719 ||  || — || January 27, 2003 || Socorro || LINEAR || FLO || align=right | 1.8 km || 
|-id=720 bgcolor=#fefefe
| 95720 ||  || — || January 28, 2003 || Socorro || LINEAR || — || align=right | 2.0 km || 
|-id=721 bgcolor=#fefefe
| 95721 ||  || — || February 1, 2003 || Socorro || LINEAR || — || align=right | 3.6 km || 
|-id=722 bgcolor=#fefefe
| 95722 ||  || — || February 3, 2003 || Haleakala || NEAT || CHL || align=right | 5.7 km || 
|-id=723 bgcolor=#fefefe
| 95723 ||  || — || February 4, 2003 || Anderson Mesa || LONEOS || — || align=right | 2.5 km || 
|-id=724 bgcolor=#E9E9E9
| 95724 ||  || — || February 4, 2003 || Anderson Mesa || LONEOS || — || align=right | 4.9 km || 
|-id=725 bgcolor=#fefefe
| 95725 ||  || — || February 6, 2003 || Kitt Peak || Spacewatch || V || align=right | 1.4 km || 
|-id=726 bgcolor=#fefefe
| 95726 ||  || — || February 6, 2003 || Kitt Peak || Spacewatch || FLO || align=right | 1.3 km || 
|-id=727 bgcolor=#fefefe
| 95727 ||  || — || February 21, 2003 || Palomar || NEAT || — || align=right | 2.6 km || 
|-id=728 bgcolor=#fefefe
| 95728 ||  || — || February 26, 2003 || Haleakala || NEAT || — || align=right | 1.8 km || 
|-id=729 bgcolor=#E9E9E9
| 95729 ||  || — || February 26, 2003 || Socorro || LINEAR || — || align=right | 3.3 km || 
|-id=730 bgcolor=#fefefe
| 95730 ||  || — || February 20, 2003 || Haleakala || NEAT || NYS || align=right | 1.3 km || 
|-id=731 bgcolor=#fefefe
| 95731 ||  || — || February 22, 2003 || Palomar || NEAT || NYS || align=right | 1.5 km || 
|-id=732 bgcolor=#fefefe
| 95732 ||  || — || February 28, 2003 || Socorro || LINEAR || — || align=right | 3.3 km || 
|-id=733 bgcolor=#fefefe
| 95733 ||  || — || February 28, 2003 || Socorro || LINEAR || — || align=right | 1.7 km || 
|-id=734 bgcolor=#fefefe
| 95734 ||  || — || March 6, 2003 || Desert Eagle || W. K. Y. Yeung || V || align=right | 1.4 km || 
|-id=735 bgcolor=#fefefe
| 95735 ||  || — || March 6, 2003 || Socorro || LINEAR || MAS || align=right | 1.7 km || 
|-id=736 bgcolor=#E9E9E9
| 95736 ||  || — || March 5, 2003 || Socorro || LINEAR || MIT || align=right | 3.2 km || 
|-id=737 bgcolor=#fefefe
| 95737 ||  || — || March 6, 2003 || Anderson Mesa || LONEOS || — || align=right | 1.5 km || 
|-id=738 bgcolor=#E9E9E9
| 95738 ||  || — || March 6, 2003 || Socorro || LINEAR || — || align=right | 4.9 km || 
|-id=739 bgcolor=#fefefe
| 95739 ||  || — || March 6, 2003 || Socorro || LINEAR || NYS || align=right | 1.3 km || 
|-id=740 bgcolor=#fefefe
| 95740 ||  || — || March 7, 2003 || Socorro || LINEAR || — || align=right | 1.3 km || 
|-id=741 bgcolor=#fefefe
| 95741 ||  || — || March 9, 2003 || Socorro || LINEAR || H || align=right | 1.3 km || 
|-id=742 bgcolor=#d6d6d6
| 95742 ||  || — || March 6, 2003 || Anderson Mesa || LONEOS || — || align=right | 5.9 km || 
|-id=743 bgcolor=#fefefe
| 95743 ||  || — || March 6, 2003 || Anderson Mesa || LONEOS || NYS || align=right | 1.4 km || 
|-id=744 bgcolor=#fefefe
| 95744 ||  || — || March 6, 2003 || Anderson Mesa || LONEOS || — || align=right | 4.0 km || 
|-id=745 bgcolor=#fefefe
| 95745 ||  || — || March 6, 2003 || Socorro || LINEAR || FLO || align=right | 1.5 km || 
|-id=746 bgcolor=#fefefe
| 95746 ||  || — || March 6, 2003 || Socorro || LINEAR || NYS || align=right | 1.4 km || 
|-id=747 bgcolor=#fefefe
| 95747 ||  || — || March 6, 2003 || Socorro || LINEAR || — || align=right | 2.5 km || 
|-id=748 bgcolor=#fefefe
| 95748 ||  || — || March 6, 2003 || Socorro || LINEAR || — || align=right | 2.0 km || 
|-id=749 bgcolor=#fefefe
| 95749 ||  || — || March 6, 2003 || Anderson Mesa || LONEOS || — || align=right | 1.5 km || 
|-id=750 bgcolor=#fefefe
| 95750 ||  || — || March 6, 2003 || Socorro || LINEAR || V || align=right | 1.3 km || 
|-id=751 bgcolor=#fefefe
| 95751 ||  || — || March 6, 2003 || Socorro || LINEAR || — || align=right | 2.1 km || 
|-id=752 bgcolor=#fefefe
| 95752 ||  || — || March 6, 2003 || Socorro || LINEAR || — || align=right | 1.6 km || 
|-id=753 bgcolor=#fefefe
| 95753 ||  || — || March 6, 2003 || Socorro || LINEAR || V || align=right | 1.3 km || 
|-id=754 bgcolor=#fefefe
| 95754 ||  || — || March 6, 2003 || Socorro || LINEAR || — || align=right | 2.0 km || 
|-id=755 bgcolor=#fefefe
| 95755 ||  || — || March 7, 2003 || Kitt Peak || Spacewatch || MAS || align=right | 1.1 km || 
|-id=756 bgcolor=#fefefe
| 95756 ||  || — || March 7, 2003 || Socorro || LINEAR || ERI || align=right | 3.5 km || 
|-id=757 bgcolor=#E9E9E9
| 95757 ||  || — || March 7, 2003 || Socorro || LINEAR || — || align=right | 2.3 km || 
|-id=758 bgcolor=#E9E9E9
| 95758 ||  || — || March 7, 2003 || Socorro || LINEAR || RAF || align=right | 1.8 km || 
|-id=759 bgcolor=#fefefe
| 95759 ||  || — || March 8, 2003 || Anderson Mesa || LONEOS || — || align=right | 3.1 km || 
|-id=760 bgcolor=#fefefe
| 95760 Protezionecivile ||  ||  || March 9, 2003 || Campo Imperatore || F. Bernardi || — || align=right | 1.7 km || 
|-id=761 bgcolor=#fefefe
| 95761 ||  || — || March 9, 2003 || Socorro || LINEAR || NYS || align=right | 1.3 km || 
|-id=762 bgcolor=#fefefe
| 95762 ||  || — || March 6, 2003 || Socorro || LINEAR || — || align=right | 1.4 km || 
|-id=763 bgcolor=#fefefe
| 95763 ||  || — || March 7, 2003 || Anderson Mesa || LONEOS || — || align=right | 1.2 km || 
|-id=764 bgcolor=#fefefe
| 95764 ||  || — || March 7, 2003 || Socorro || LINEAR || — || align=right | 1.8 km || 
|-id=765 bgcolor=#fefefe
| 95765 ||  || — || March 7, 2003 || Socorro || LINEAR || — || align=right | 2.0 km || 
|-id=766 bgcolor=#fefefe
| 95766 ||  || — || March 7, 2003 || Anderson Mesa || LONEOS || — || align=right | 2.6 km || 
|-id=767 bgcolor=#E9E9E9
| 95767 ||  || — || March 8, 2003 || Anderson Mesa || LONEOS || — || align=right | 7.1 km || 
|-id=768 bgcolor=#fefefe
| 95768 ||  || — || March 8, 2003 || Socorro || LINEAR || H || align=right | 1.7 km || 
|-id=769 bgcolor=#E9E9E9
| 95769 ||  || — || March 9, 2003 || Anderson Mesa || LONEOS || — || align=right | 3.6 km || 
|-id=770 bgcolor=#fefefe
| 95770 ||  || — || March 10, 2003 || Socorro || LINEAR || V || align=right | 1.2 km || 
|-id=771 bgcolor=#E9E9E9
| 95771 Lachat ||  ||  || March 9, 2003 || Vicques || M. Ory || — || align=right | 3.2 km || 
|-id=772 bgcolor=#fefefe
| 95772 ||  || — || March 11, 2003 || Palomar || NEAT || — || align=right | 1.8 km || 
|-id=773 bgcolor=#fefefe
| 95773 ||  || — || March 8, 2003 || Anderson Mesa || LONEOS || PHO || align=right | 2.7 km || 
|-id=774 bgcolor=#E9E9E9
| 95774 ||  || — || March 9, 2003 || Socorro || LINEAR || EUN || align=right | 2.1 km || 
|-id=775 bgcolor=#E9E9E9
| 95775 ||  || — || March 10, 2003 || Socorro || LINEAR || MIT || align=right | 4.7 km || 
|-id=776 bgcolor=#E9E9E9
| 95776 ||  || — || March 9, 2003 || Anderson Mesa || LONEOS || — || align=right | 6.7 km || 
|-id=777 bgcolor=#E9E9E9
| 95777 ||  || — || March 11, 2003 || Socorro || LINEAR || EUN || align=right | 2.4 km || 
|-id=778 bgcolor=#fefefe
| 95778 ||  || — || March 12, 2003 || Palomar || NEAT || — || align=right | 4.4 km || 
|-id=779 bgcolor=#fefefe
| 95779 ||  || — || March 12, 2003 || Socorro || LINEAR || H || align=right | 3.7 km || 
|-id=780 bgcolor=#E9E9E9
| 95780 ||  || — || March 7, 2003 || Goodricke-Pigott || R. A. Tucker || — || align=right | 3.5 km || 
|-id=781 bgcolor=#E9E9E9
| 95781 ||  || — || March 12, 2003 || Socorro || LINEAR || — || align=right | 2.4 km || 
|-id=782 bgcolor=#E9E9E9
| 95782 Hansgraf ||  ||  || March 24, 2003 || Needville || J. Dellinger || JUN || align=right | 1.7 km || 
|-id=783 bgcolor=#fefefe
| 95783 ||  || — || March 27, 2003 || Campo Imperatore || CINEOS || FLO || align=right | 1.6 km || 
|-id=784 bgcolor=#E9E9E9
| 95784 ||  || — || March 28, 2003 || La Silla || G. Masi || — || align=right | 1.5 km || 
|-id=785 bgcolor=#E9E9E9
| 95785 Csányivilmos ||  ||  || March 27, 2003 || Piszkéstető || K. Sárneczky || — || align=right | 3.0 km || 
|-id=786 bgcolor=#FA8072
| 95786 ||  || — || March 29, 2003 || Anderson Mesa || LONEOS || H || align=right | 1.6 km || 
|-id=787 bgcolor=#E9E9E9
| 95787 ||  || — || March 22, 2003 || Palomar || NEAT || EUN || align=right | 2.8 km || 
|-id=788 bgcolor=#E9E9E9
| 95788 ||  || — || March 22, 2003 || Palomar || NEAT || — || align=right | 1.9 km || 
|-id=789 bgcolor=#fefefe
| 95789 ||  || — || March 23, 2003 || Palomar || NEAT || — || align=right | 1.6 km || 
|-id=790 bgcolor=#E9E9E9
| 95790 ||  || — || March 23, 2003 || Palomar || NEAT || — || align=right | 3.4 km || 
|-id=791 bgcolor=#fefefe
| 95791 ||  || — || March 24, 2003 || Kitt Peak || Spacewatch || MAS || align=right | 1.3 km || 
|-id=792 bgcolor=#fefefe
| 95792 ||  || — || March 23, 2003 || Palomar || NEAT || — || align=right | 2.2 km || 
|-id=793 bgcolor=#fefefe
| 95793 Brock ||  ||  || March 23, 2003 || Catalina || CSS || — || align=right | 2.6 km || 
|-id=794 bgcolor=#E9E9E9
| 95794 ||  || — || March 25, 2003 || Kvistaberg || UDAS || — || align=right | 2.3 km || 
|-id=795 bgcolor=#E9E9E9
| 95795 ||  || — || March 23, 2003 || Kitt Peak || Spacewatch || — || align=right | 2.5 km || 
|-id=796 bgcolor=#fefefe
| 95796 ||  || — || March 23, 2003 || Haleakala || NEAT || NYS || align=right | 1.5 km || 
|-id=797 bgcolor=#fefefe
| 95797 ||  || — || March 24, 2003 || Kitt Peak || Spacewatch || — || align=right | 1.8 km || 
|-id=798 bgcolor=#E9E9E9
| 95798 ||  || — || March 24, 2003 || Haleakala || NEAT || INO || align=right | 2.1 km || 
|-id=799 bgcolor=#E9E9E9
| 95799 ||  || — || March 25, 2003 || Haleakala || NEAT || GEF || align=right | 2.7 km || 
|-id=800 bgcolor=#d6d6d6
| 95800 ||  || — || March 25, 2003 || Haleakala || NEAT || — || align=right | 6.8 km || 
|}

95801–95900 

|-bgcolor=#E9E9E9
| 95801 ||  || — || March 26, 2003 || Kitt Peak || Spacewatch || KON || align=right | 4.7 km || 
|-id=802 bgcolor=#fefefe
| 95802 Francismuir ||  ||  || March 31, 2003 || Needville || J. Dellinger || — || align=right | 2.1 km || 
|-id=803 bgcolor=#fefefe
| 95803 ||  || — || March 24, 2003 || Kitt Peak || Spacewatch || — || align=right | 1.8 km || 
|-id=804 bgcolor=#fefefe
| 95804 ||  || — || March 24, 2003 || Kitt Peak || Spacewatch || NYS || align=right | 1.4 km || 
|-id=805 bgcolor=#d6d6d6
| 95805 ||  || — || March 24, 2003 || Haleakala || NEAT || — || align=right | 3.8 km || 
|-id=806 bgcolor=#d6d6d6
| 95806 ||  || — || March 25, 2003 || Haleakala || NEAT || 627 || align=right | 9.5 km || 
|-id=807 bgcolor=#E9E9E9
| 95807 ||  || — || March 25, 2003 || Palomar || NEAT || — || align=right | 2.0 km || 
|-id=808 bgcolor=#fefefe
| 95808 ||  || — || March 25, 2003 || Palomar || NEAT || V || align=right | 1.3 km || 
|-id=809 bgcolor=#fefefe
| 95809 ||  || — || March 25, 2003 || Haleakala || NEAT || — || align=right | 1.2 km || 
|-id=810 bgcolor=#E9E9E9
| 95810 ||  || — || March 25, 2003 || Haleakala || NEAT || — || align=right | 5.2 km || 
|-id=811 bgcolor=#E9E9E9
| 95811 ||  || — || March 26, 2003 || Palomar || NEAT || — || align=right | 2.8 km || 
|-id=812 bgcolor=#fefefe
| 95812 ||  || — || March 26, 2003 || Palomar || NEAT || — || align=right | 1.2 km || 
|-id=813 bgcolor=#fefefe
| 95813 ||  || — || March 26, 2003 || Palomar || NEAT || NYS || align=right | 1.4 km || 
|-id=814 bgcolor=#fefefe
| 95814 ||  || — || March 26, 2003 || Kitt Peak || Spacewatch || V || align=right | 1.6 km || 
|-id=815 bgcolor=#fefefe
| 95815 ||  || — || March 26, 2003 || Haleakala || NEAT || — || align=right | 3.4 km || 
|-id=816 bgcolor=#fefefe
| 95816 ||  || — || March 26, 2003 || Palomar || NEAT || V || align=right | 1.5 km || 
|-id=817 bgcolor=#E9E9E9
| 95817 ||  || — || March 26, 2003 || Haleakala || NEAT || EUN || align=right | 2.6 km || 
|-id=818 bgcolor=#fefefe
| 95818 ||  || — || March 27, 2003 || Palomar || NEAT || FLO || align=right | 1.8 km || 
|-id=819 bgcolor=#E9E9E9
| 95819 ||  || — || March 27, 2003 || Palomar || NEAT || — || align=right | 3.0 km || 
|-id=820 bgcolor=#E9E9E9
| 95820 ||  || — || March 27, 2003 || Socorro || LINEAR || DOR || align=right | 5.4 km || 
|-id=821 bgcolor=#E9E9E9
| 95821 ||  || — || March 27, 2003 || Palomar || NEAT || EUN || align=right | 2.1 km || 
|-id=822 bgcolor=#E9E9E9
| 95822 ||  || — || March 27, 2003 || Palomar || NEAT || — || align=right | 1.7 km || 
|-id=823 bgcolor=#fefefe
| 95823 ||  || — || March 27, 2003 || Palomar || NEAT || — || align=right | 1.4 km || 
|-id=824 bgcolor=#fefefe
| 95824 Elger ||  ||  || March 28, 2003 || Catalina || CSS || FLO || align=right | 1.3 km || 
|-id=825 bgcolor=#E9E9E9
| 95825 ||  || — || March 28, 2003 || Kitt Peak || Spacewatch || — || align=right | 2.0 km || 
|-id=826 bgcolor=#E9E9E9
| 95826 ||  || — || March 28, 2003 || Kitt Peak || Spacewatch || — || align=right | 2.0 km || 
|-id=827 bgcolor=#fefefe
| 95827 ||  || — || March 28, 2003 || Kitt Peak || Spacewatch || — || align=right | 1.6 km || 
|-id=828 bgcolor=#fefefe
| 95828 ||  || — || March 29, 2003 || Anderson Mesa || LONEOS || — || align=right | 1.9 km || 
|-id=829 bgcolor=#fefefe
| 95829 ||  || — || March 29, 2003 || Anderson Mesa || LONEOS || FLO || align=right | 1.3 km || 
|-id=830 bgcolor=#E9E9E9
| 95830 ||  || — || March 29, 2003 || Anderson Mesa || LONEOS || — || align=right | 1.9 km || 
|-id=831 bgcolor=#E9E9E9
| 95831 ||  || — || March 29, 2003 || Anderson Mesa || LONEOS || NEM || align=right | 4.3 km || 
|-id=832 bgcolor=#fefefe
| 95832 ||  || — || March 30, 2003 || Socorro || LINEAR || — || align=right | 2.6 km || 
|-id=833 bgcolor=#fefefe
| 95833 ||  || — || March 30, 2003 || Socorro || LINEAR || NYS || align=right | 1.5 km || 
|-id=834 bgcolor=#fefefe
| 95834 ||  || — || March 31, 2003 || Socorro || LINEAR || — || align=right | 1.7 km || 
|-id=835 bgcolor=#d6d6d6
| 95835 ||  || — || March 24, 2003 || Kitt Peak || Spacewatch || — || align=right | 3.9 km || 
|-id=836 bgcolor=#E9E9E9
| 95836 ||  || — || March 25, 2003 || Haleakala || NEAT || — || align=right | 2.8 km || 
|-id=837 bgcolor=#E9E9E9
| 95837 ||  || — || March 26, 2003 || Palomar || NEAT || — || align=right | 2.9 km || 
|-id=838 bgcolor=#fefefe
| 95838 ||  || — || March 30, 2003 || Socorro || LINEAR || V || align=right | 1.9 km || 
|-id=839 bgcolor=#fefefe
| 95839 ||  || — || March 30, 2003 || Socorro || LINEAR || V || align=right | 1.8 km || 
|-id=840 bgcolor=#E9E9E9
| 95840 ||  || — || March 30, 2003 || Socorro || LINEAR || — || align=right | 5.5 km || 
|-id=841 bgcolor=#E9E9E9
| 95841 ||  || — || March 31, 2003 || Anderson Mesa || LONEOS || — || align=right | 2.6 km || 
|-id=842 bgcolor=#fefefe
| 95842 ||  || — || March 31, 2003 || Socorro || LINEAR || — || align=right | 2.2 km || 
|-id=843 bgcolor=#fefefe
| 95843 ||  || — || March 31, 2003 || Socorro || LINEAR || — || align=right | 1.9 km || 
|-id=844 bgcolor=#fefefe
| 95844 ||  || — || March 31, 2003 || Socorro || LINEAR || — || align=right | 1.1 km || 
|-id=845 bgcolor=#fefefe
| 95845 ||  || — || March 31, 2003 || Kitt Peak || Spacewatch || V || align=right | 1.4 km || 
|-id=846 bgcolor=#E9E9E9
| 95846 ||  || — || March 31, 2003 || Kitt Peak || Spacewatch || — || align=right | 5.8 km || 
|-id=847 bgcolor=#E9E9E9
| 95847 ||  || — || March 26, 2003 || Anderson Mesa || LONEOS || — || align=right | 4.0 km || 
|-id=848 bgcolor=#E9E9E9
| 95848 ||  || — || March 26, 2003 || Anderson Mesa || LONEOS || DOR || align=right | 5.5 km || 
|-id=849 bgcolor=#fefefe
| 95849 ||  || — || March 25, 2003 || Anderson Mesa || LONEOS || — || align=right | 1.4 km || 
|-id=850 bgcolor=#d6d6d6
| 95850 ||  || — || March 29, 2003 || Anderson Mesa || LONEOS || MEL || align=right | 6.7 km || 
|-id=851 bgcolor=#E9E9E9
| 95851 Stromvil ||  ||  || March 26, 2003 || Moletai || K. Černis, K. Zdanavičius || — || align=right | 1.8 km || 
|-id=852 bgcolor=#fefefe
| 95852 Leatherbarrow ||  ||  || March 31, 2003 || Catalina || CSS || MAS || align=right | 1.6 km || 
|-id=853 bgcolor=#fefefe
| 95853 Jamescarpenter ||  ||  || March 31, 2003 || Catalina || CSS || — || align=right | 1.7 km || 
|-id=854 bgcolor=#fefefe
| 95854 ||  || — || April 1, 2003 || Socorro || LINEAR || FLO || align=right | 1.6 km || 
|-id=855 bgcolor=#fefefe
| 95855 ||  || — || April 1, 2003 || Socorro || LINEAR || NYS || align=right | 1.4 km || 
|-id=856 bgcolor=#E9E9E9
| 95856 ||  || — || April 1, 2003 || Haleakala || NEAT || ADE || align=right | 6.4 km || 
|-id=857 bgcolor=#E9E9E9
| 95857 ||  || — || April 2, 2003 || Socorro || LINEAR || — || align=right | 4.7 km || 
|-id=858 bgcolor=#fefefe
| 95858 ||  || — || April 2, 2003 || Socorro || LINEAR || — || align=right | 1.5 km || 
|-id=859 bgcolor=#fefefe
| 95859 ||  || — || April 2, 2003 || Haleakala || NEAT || LCI || align=right | 2.5 km || 
|-id=860 bgcolor=#fefefe
| 95860 ||  || — || April 2, 2003 || Haleakala || NEAT || — || align=right | 1.8 km || 
|-id=861 bgcolor=#E9E9E9
| 95861 ||  || — || April 1, 2003 || Socorro || LINEAR || JUN || align=right | 2.7 km || 
|-id=862 bgcolor=#fefefe
| 95862 ||  || — || April 3, 2003 || Anderson Mesa || LONEOS || — || align=right | 1.6 km || 
|-id=863 bgcolor=#E9E9E9
| 95863 ||  || — || April 5, 2003 || Anderson Mesa || LONEOS || EUN || align=right | 1.7 km || 
|-id=864 bgcolor=#d6d6d6
| 95864 ||  || — || April 6, 2003 || Desert Eagle || W. K. Y. Yeung || — || align=right | 4.0 km || 
|-id=865 bgcolor=#d6d6d6
| 95865 ||  || — || April 3, 2003 || Anderson Mesa || LONEOS || — || align=right | 6.0 km || 
|-id=866 bgcolor=#fefefe
| 95866 ||  || — || April 4, 2003 || Anderson Mesa || LONEOS || — || align=right | 1.9 km || 
|-id=867 bgcolor=#E9E9E9
| 95867 ||  || — || April 4, 2003 || Anderson Mesa || LONEOS || — || align=right | 5.2 km || 
|-id=868 bgcolor=#d6d6d6
| 95868 ||  || — || April 4, 2003 || Haleakala || NEAT || — || align=right | 6.6 km || 
|-id=869 bgcolor=#fefefe
| 95869 ||  || — || April 5, 2003 || Kitt Peak || Spacewatch || — || align=right | 1.9 km || 
|-id=870 bgcolor=#E9E9E9
| 95870 ||  || — || April 5, 2003 || Anderson Mesa || LONEOS || MAR || align=right | 2.3 km || 
|-id=871 bgcolor=#E9E9E9
| 95871 ||  || — || April 8, 2003 || Kvistaberg || UDAS || MAR || align=right | 2.2 km || 
|-id=872 bgcolor=#E9E9E9
| 95872 ||  || — || April 5, 2003 || Anderson Mesa || LONEOS || — || align=right | 3.2 km || 
|-id=873 bgcolor=#fefefe
| 95873 ||  || — || April 6, 2003 || Kitt Peak || Spacewatch || — || align=right | 2.2 km || 
|-id=874 bgcolor=#fefefe
| 95874 ||  || — || April 9, 2003 || Socorro || LINEAR || — || align=right | 2.1 km || 
|-id=875 bgcolor=#fefefe
| 95875 ||  || — || April 7, 2003 || Socorro || LINEAR || MAS || align=right | 1.5 km || 
|-id=876 bgcolor=#d6d6d6
| 95876 ||  || — || April 8, 2003 || Palomar || NEAT || — || align=right | 5.1 km || 
|-id=877 bgcolor=#E9E9E9
| 95877 ||  || — || April 8, 2003 || Palomar || NEAT || — || align=right | 2.8 km || 
|-id=878 bgcolor=#d6d6d6
| 95878 ||  || — || April 4, 2003 || Kitt Peak || Spacewatch || — || align=right | 4.3 km || 
|-id=879 bgcolor=#d6d6d6
| 95879 ||  || — || April 8, 2003 || Haleakala || NEAT || — || align=right | 5.8 km || 
|-id=880 bgcolor=#E9E9E9
| 95880 ||  || — || April 4, 2003 || Kitt Peak || Spacewatch || — || align=right | 4.7 km || 
|-id=881 bgcolor=#fefefe
| 95881 || 2003 HR || — || April 20, 2003 || Haleakala || NEAT || — || align=right | 1.7 km || 
|-id=882 bgcolor=#fefefe
| 95882 Longshaw || 2003 HW ||  || April 21, 2003 || Catalina || CSS || — || align=right | 1.7 km || 
|-id=883 bgcolor=#d6d6d6
| 95883 ||  || — || April 24, 2003 || Anderson Mesa || LONEOS || — || align=right | 3.9 km || 
|-id=884 bgcolor=#E9E9E9
| 95884 ||  || — || April 24, 2003 || Anderson Mesa || LONEOS || ADE || align=right | 4.1 km || 
|-id=885 bgcolor=#E9E9E9
| 95885 ||  || — || April 24, 2003 || Anderson Mesa || LONEOS || — || align=right | 3.8 km || 
|-id=886 bgcolor=#d6d6d6
| 95886 ||  || — || April 24, 2003 || Anderson Mesa || LONEOS || — || align=right | 5.5 km || 
|-id=887 bgcolor=#fefefe
| 95887 ||  || — || April 24, 2003 || Kitt Peak || Spacewatch || NYS || align=right | 3.3 km || 
|-id=888 bgcolor=#E9E9E9
| 95888 ||  || — || April 24, 2003 || Anderson Mesa || LONEOS || — || align=right | 2.6 km || 
|-id=889 bgcolor=#fefefe
| 95889 ||  || — || April 24, 2003 || Anderson Mesa || LONEOS || — || align=right | 1.5 km || 
|-id=890 bgcolor=#E9E9E9
| 95890 ||  || — || April 24, 2003 || Haleakala || NEAT || — || align=right | 2.2 km || 
|-id=891 bgcolor=#E9E9E9
| 95891 ||  || — || April 25, 2003 || Kitt Peak || Spacewatch || — || align=right | 2.4 km || 
|-id=892 bgcolor=#fefefe
| 95892 ||  || — || April 24, 2003 || Anderson Mesa || LONEOS || PHO || align=right | 2.4 km || 
|-id=893 bgcolor=#E9E9E9
| 95893 ||  || — || April 25, 2003 || Anderson Mesa || LONEOS || — || align=right | 5.7 km || 
|-id=894 bgcolor=#E9E9E9
| 95894 ||  || — || April 25, 2003 || Anderson Mesa || LONEOS || — || align=right | 6.1 km || 
|-id=895 bgcolor=#fefefe
| 95895 Sebastiano ||  ||  || April 25, 2003 || Campo Imperatore || M. Tombelli, S. Foglia || V || align=right | 1.4 km || 
|-id=896 bgcolor=#fefefe
| 95896 ||  || — || April 24, 2003 || Kitt Peak || Spacewatch || V || align=right | 1.3 km || 
|-id=897 bgcolor=#fefefe
| 95897 ||  || — || April 26, 2003 || Haleakala || NEAT || V || align=right | 1.5 km || 
|-id=898 bgcolor=#fefefe
| 95898 ||  || — || April 28, 2003 || Anderson Mesa || LONEOS || — || align=right | 2.0 km || 
|-id=899 bgcolor=#fefefe
| 95899 ||  || — || April 24, 2003 || Anderson Mesa || LONEOS || FLO || align=right | 1.6 km || 
|-id=900 bgcolor=#fefefe
| 95900 ||  || — || April 25, 2003 || Kitt Peak || Spacewatch || — || align=right | 1.6 km || 
|}

95901–96000 

|-bgcolor=#E9E9E9
| 95901 ||  || — || April 26, 2003 || Kitt Peak || Spacewatch || — || align=right | 1.8 km || 
|-id=902 bgcolor=#d6d6d6
| 95902 ||  || — || April 28, 2003 || Socorro || LINEAR || — || align=right | 7.1 km || 
|-id=903 bgcolor=#d6d6d6
| 95903 ||  || — || April 27, 2003 || Anderson Mesa || LONEOS || JLI || align=right | 7.0 km || 
|-id=904 bgcolor=#fefefe
| 95904 ||  || — || April 28, 2003 || Anderson Mesa || LONEOS || NYS || align=right | 1.2 km || 
|-id=905 bgcolor=#E9E9E9
| 95905 ||  || — || April 28, 2003 || Anderson Mesa || LONEOS || JUN || align=right | 1.9 km || 
|-id=906 bgcolor=#E9E9E9
| 95906 ||  || — || April 28, 2003 || Anderson Mesa || LONEOS || — || align=right | 4.9 km || 
|-id=907 bgcolor=#fefefe
| 95907 ||  || — || April 26, 2003 || Kitt Peak || Spacewatch || — || align=right | 1.4 km || 
|-id=908 bgcolor=#E9E9E9
| 95908 ||  || — || April 28, 2003 || Socorro || LINEAR || — || align=right | 2.4 km || 
|-id=909 bgcolor=#d6d6d6
| 95909 ||  || — || April 28, 2003 || Socorro || LINEAR || — || align=right | 4.1 km || 
|-id=910 bgcolor=#E9E9E9
| 95910 ||  || — || April 27, 2003 || Anderson Mesa || LONEOS || — || align=right | 2.8 km || 
|-id=911 bgcolor=#fefefe
| 95911 ||  || — || April 29, 2003 || Socorro || LINEAR || V || align=right | 1.6 km || 
|-id=912 bgcolor=#d6d6d6
| 95912 ||  || — || April 29, 2003 || Socorro || LINEAR || SAN || align=right | 3.4 km || 
|-id=913 bgcolor=#E9E9E9
| 95913 ||  || — || April 29, 2003 || Socorro || LINEAR || — || align=right | 5.8 km || 
|-id=914 bgcolor=#E9E9E9
| 95914 ||  || — || April 29, 2003 || Haleakala || NEAT || — || align=right | 2.9 km || 
|-id=915 bgcolor=#fefefe
| 95915 ||  || — || April 28, 2003 || Socorro || LINEAR || FLO || align=right | 1.2 km || 
|-id=916 bgcolor=#fefefe
| 95916 ||  || — || April 30, 2003 || Socorro || LINEAR || V || align=right | 1.4 km || 
|-id=917 bgcolor=#E9E9E9
| 95917 ||  || — || April 30, 2003 || Socorro || LINEAR || MAR || align=right | 2.8 km || 
|-id=918 bgcolor=#E9E9E9
| 95918 ||  || — || April 30, 2003 || Socorro || LINEAR || — || align=right | 1.8 km || 
|-id=919 bgcolor=#E9E9E9
| 95919 ||  || — || April 28, 2003 || Socorro || LINEAR || RAF || align=right | 2.1 km || 
|-id=920 bgcolor=#d6d6d6
| 95920 ||  || — || April 30, 2003 || Haleakala || NEAT || — || align=right | 3.6 km || 
|-id=921 bgcolor=#fefefe
| 95921 ||  || — || April 30, 2003 || Reedy Creek || J. Broughton || V || align=right | 1.2 km || 
|-id=922 bgcolor=#fefefe
| 95922 ||  || — || April 24, 2003 || Anderson Mesa || LONEOS || — || align=right | 1.7 km || 
|-id=923 bgcolor=#d6d6d6
| 95923 ||  || — || April 27, 2003 || Anderson Mesa || LONEOS || — || align=right | 4.8 km || 
|-id=924 bgcolor=#fefefe
| 95924 ||  || — || May 2, 2003 || Socorro || LINEAR || FLO || align=right | 2.2 km || 
|-id=925 bgcolor=#fefefe
| 95925 ||  || — || May 1, 2003 || Socorro || LINEAR || — || align=right | 1.7 km || 
|-id=926 bgcolor=#fefefe
| 95926 ||  || — || May 2, 2003 || Kitt Peak || Spacewatch || V || align=right | 1.4 km || 
|-id=927 bgcolor=#E9E9E9
| 95927 ||  || — || May 3, 2003 || Kitt Peak || Spacewatch || — || align=right | 4.0 km || 
|-id=928 bgcolor=#E9E9E9
| 95928 Tonycook ||  ||  || May 7, 2003 || Catalina || CSS || EUN || align=right | 3.8 km || 
|-id=929 bgcolor=#E9E9E9
| 95929 ||  || — || May 8, 2003 || Haleakala || NEAT || ADE || align=right | 5.7 km || 
|-id=930 bgcolor=#d6d6d6
| 95930 ||  || — || May 8, 2003 || Haleakala || NEAT || — || align=right | 5.4 km || 
|-id=931 bgcolor=#d6d6d6
| 95931 ||  || — || May 11, 2003 || Anderson Mesa || LONEOS || EUP || align=right | 8.6 km || 
|-id=932 bgcolor=#E9E9E9
| 95932 ||  || — || May 8, 2003 || Socorro || LINEAR || — || align=right | 4.2 km || 
|-id=933 bgcolor=#d6d6d6
| 95933 || 2003 KF || — || May 20, 2003 || Anderson Mesa || LONEOS || — || align=right | 4.0 km || 
|-id=934 bgcolor=#d6d6d6
| 95934 ||  || — || May 22, 2003 || Kitt Peak || Spacewatch || — || align=right | 4.4 km || 
|-id=935 bgcolor=#fefefe
| 95935 Grego ||  ||  || May 25, 2003 || Catalina || CSS || V || align=right | 1.3 km || 
|-id=936 bgcolor=#d6d6d6
| 95936 ||  || — || May 26, 2003 || Haleakala || NEAT || — || align=right | 5.5 km || 
|-id=937 bgcolor=#d6d6d6
| 95937 ||  || — || May 28, 2003 || Needville || J. Dellinger || — || align=right | 5.3 km || 
|-id=938 bgcolor=#E9E9E9
| 95938 ||  || — || May 31, 2003 || Socorro || LINEAR || — || align=right | 4.4 km || 
|-id=939 bgcolor=#E9E9E9
| 95939 Thagnesland ||  ||  || May 30, 2003 || Wrightwood || J. W. Young || — || align=right | 2.2 km || 
|-id=940 bgcolor=#E9E9E9
| 95940 ||  || — || June 1, 2003 || Reedy Creek || J. Broughton || — || align=right | 3.8 km || 
|-id=941 bgcolor=#E9E9E9
| 95941 ||  || — || June 5, 2003 || Reedy Creek || J. Broughton || — || align=right | 2.8 km || 
|-id=942 bgcolor=#d6d6d6
| 95942 ||  || — || June 4, 2003 || Reedy Creek || J. Broughton || — || align=right | 6.0 km || 
|-id=943 bgcolor=#d6d6d6
| 95943 ||  || — || June 9, 2003 || Reedy Creek || J. Broughton || — || align=right | 6.9 km || 
|-id=944 bgcolor=#d6d6d6
| 95944 ||  || — || June 23, 2003 || Anderson Mesa || LONEOS || EUP || align=right | 10 km || 
|-id=945 bgcolor=#d6d6d6
| 95945 ||  || — || June 26, 2003 || Socorro || LINEAR || MEL || align=right | 7.9 km || 
|-id=946 bgcolor=#d6d6d6
| 95946 ||  || — || June 27, 2003 || Haleakala || NEAT || EUP || align=right | 8.3 km || 
|-id=947 bgcolor=#d6d6d6
| 95947 ||  || — || July 1, 2003 || Haleakala || NEAT || — || align=right | 8.0 km || 
|-id=948 bgcolor=#d6d6d6
| 95948 ||  || — || July 25, 2003 || Palomar || NEAT || URS || align=right | 7.1 km || 
|-id=949 bgcolor=#d6d6d6
| 95949 ||  || — || July 30, 2003 || Palomar || NEAT || — || align=right | 7.8 km || 
|-id=950 bgcolor=#E9E9E9
| 95950 ||  || — || July 30, 2003 || Palomar || NEAT || — || align=right | 2.9 km || 
|-id=951 bgcolor=#d6d6d6
| 95951 Ernestopalomba ||  ||  || August 18, 2003 || Campo Imperatore || F. Bernardi || — || align=right | 10 km || 
|-id=952 bgcolor=#d6d6d6
| 95952 ||  || — || August 22, 2003 || Haleakala || NEAT || 3:2 || align=right | 15 km || 
|-id=953 bgcolor=#d6d6d6
| 95953 ||  || — || August 22, 2003 || Palomar || NEAT || — || align=right | 9.3 km || 
|-id=954 bgcolor=#d6d6d6
| 95954 Bayzoltán ||  ||  || August 23, 2003 || Piszkéstető || K. Sárneczky, B. Sipőcz || — || align=right | 6.0 km || 
|-id=955 bgcolor=#d6d6d6
| 95955 Claragianni ||  ||  || August 21, 2003 || Campo Imperatore || E. Palomba || — || align=right | 7.9 km || 
|-id=956 bgcolor=#d6d6d6
| 95956 ||  || — || September 13, 2003 || Haleakala || NEAT || EUP || align=right | 8.2 km || 
|-id=957 bgcolor=#d6d6d6
| 95957 ||  || — || September 20, 2003 || Haleakala || NEAT || 3:2 || align=right | 13 km || 
|-id=958 bgcolor=#d6d6d6
| 95958 ||  || — || September 23, 2003 || Haleakala || NEAT || EOS || align=right | 3.9 km || 
|-id=959 bgcolor=#d6d6d6
| 95959 Covadonga ||  ||  || September 28, 2003 || La Cañada || J. Lacruz || — || align=right | 4.7 km || 
|-id=960 bgcolor=#d6d6d6
| 95960 ||  || — || September 20, 2003 || Socorro || LINEAR || — || align=right | 7.2 km || 
|-id=961 bgcolor=#E9E9E9
| 95961 ||  || — || October 21, 2003 || Kitt Peak || Spacewatch || — || align=right | 4.1 km || 
|-id=962 bgcolor=#d6d6d6
| 95962 Copito ||  ||  || November 19, 2003 || Begues || J. Manteca || ALA || align=right | 6.7 km || 
|-id=963 bgcolor=#E9E9E9
| 95963 ||  || — || May 16, 2004 || Socorro || LINEAR || — || align=right | 6.8 km || 
|-id=964 bgcolor=#fefefe
| 95964 ||  || — || May 17, 2004 || Socorro || LINEAR || — || align=right | 2.2 km || 
|-id=965 bgcolor=#fefefe
| 95965 ||  || — || May 27, 2004 || Kitt Peak || Spacewatch || NYS || align=right | 1.6 km || 
|-id=966 bgcolor=#d6d6d6
| 95966 ||  || — || May 27, 2004 || Kitt Peak || Spacewatch || THM || align=right | 3.7 km || 
|-id=967 bgcolor=#d6d6d6
| 95967 ||  || — || June 10, 2004 || Socorro || LINEAR || Tj (2.99) || align=right | 7.6 km || 
|-id=968 bgcolor=#E9E9E9
| 95968 ||  || — || June 12, 2004 || Socorro || LINEAR || — || align=right | 4.7 km || 
|-id=969 bgcolor=#fefefe
| 95969 ||  || — || June 12, 2004 || Socorro || LINEAR || — || align=right | 1.8 km || 
|-id=970 bgcolor=#fefefe
| 95970 ||  || — || June 12, 2004 || Socorro || LINEAR || ERI || align=right | 3.2 km || 
|-id=971 bgcolor=#fefefe
| 95971 ||  || — || June 12, 2004 || Socorro || LINEAR || NYS || align=right | 1.9 km || 
|-id=972 bgcolor=#E9E9E9
| 95972 ||  || — || June 12, 2004 || Palomar || NEAT || DOR || align=right | 5.3 km || 
|-id=973 bgcolor=#fefefe
| 95973 ||  || — || June 13, 2004 || Socorro || LINEAR || — || align=right | 2.0 km || 
|-id=974 bgcolor=#E9E9E9
| 95974 ||  || — || June 14, 2004 || Socorro || LINEAR || EUN || align=right | 2.6 km || 
|-id=975 bgcolor=#d6d6d6
| 95975 ||  || — || June 14, 2004 || Socorro || LINEAR || — || align=right | 6.0 km || 
|-id=976 bgcolor=#fefefe
| 95976 ||  || — || June 14, 2004 || Socorro || LINEAR || NYS || align=right | 1.9 km || 
|-id=977 bgcolor=#fefefe
| 95977 ||  || — || June 12, 2004 || Anderson Mesa || LONEOS || — || align=right | 1.5 km || 
|-id=978 bgcolor=#E9E9E9
| 95978 ||  || — || June 14, 2004 || Socorro || LINEAR || — || align=right | 5.0 km || 
|-id=979 bgcolor=#fefefe
| 95979 ||  || — || June 15, 2004 || Socorro || LINEAR || — || align=right | 1.3 km || 
|-id=980 bgcolor=#E9E9E9
| 95980 Haroldhill ||  ||  || June 14, 2004 || Catalina || CSS || — || align=right | 2.8 km || 
|-id=981 bgcolor=#E9E9E9
| 95981 ||  || — || June 13, 2004 || Socorro || LINEAR || — || align=right | 4.4 km || 
|-id=982 bgcolor=#fefefe
| 95982 Beish ||  ||  || June 19, 2004 || Catalina || CSS || — || align=right | 4.4 km || 
|-id=983 bgcolor=#E9E9E9
| 95983 ||  || — || June 22, 2004 || Kitt Peak || Spacewatch || — || align=right | 4.1 km || 
|-id=984 bgcolor=#d6d6d6
| 95984 ||  || — || July 9, 2004 || Socorro || LINEAR || — || align=right | 6.8 km || 
|-id=985 bgcolor=#fefefe
| 95985 ||  || — || July 9, 2004 || Socorro || LINEAR || — || align=right | 2.1 km || 
|-id=986 bgcolor=#E9E9E9
| 95986 ||  || — || July 10, 2004 || Palomar || NEAT || NEM || align=right | 4.6 km || 
|-id=987 bgcolor=#fefefe
| 95987 ||  || — || July 11, 2004 || Socorro || LINEAR || — || align=right | 1.7 km || 
|-id=988 bgcolor=#fefefe
| 95988 ||  || — || July 14, 2004 || Socorro || LINEAR || PHO || align=right | 2.9 km || 
|-id=989 bgcolor=#E9E9E9
| 95989 ||  || — || July 9, 2004 || Palomar || NEAT || KRM || align=right | 4.4 km || 
|-id=990 bgcolor=#d6d6d6
| 95990 ||  || — || July 11, 2004 || Socorro || LINEAR || TIR || align=right | 6.3 km || 
|-id=991 bgcolor=#E9E9E9
| 95991 ||  || — || July 11, 2004 || Socorro || LINEAR || — || align=right | 3.7 km || 
|-id=992 bgcolor=#E9E9E9
| 95992 ||  || — || July 11, 2004 || Socorro || LINEAR || EUN || align=right | 1.5 km || 
|-id=993 bgcolor=#E9E9E9
| 95993 ||  || — || July 9, 2004 || Socorro || LINEAR || — || align=right | 4.8 km || 
|-id=994 bgcolor=#d6d6d6
| 95994 ||  || — || July 10, 2004 || Catalina || CSS || — || align=right | 6.1 km || 
|-id=995 bgcolor=#d6d6d6
| 95995 ||  || — || July 10, 2004 || Catalina || CSS || 7:4 || align=right | 6.1 km || 
|-id=996 bgcolor=#fefefe
| 95996 ||  || — || July 11, 2004 || Socorro || LINEAR || NYS || align=right | 1.5 km || 
|-id=997 bgcolor=#d6d6d6
| 95997 ||  || — || July 11, 2004 || Socorro || LINEAR || URS || align=right | 7.0 km || 
|-id=998 bgcolor=#d6d6d6
| 95998 ||  || — || July 11, 2004 || Socorro || LINEAR || — || align=right | 5.9 km || 
|-id=999 bgcolor=#fefefe
| 95999 ||  || — || July 15, 2004 || Socorro || LINEAR || — || align=right | 2.3 km || 
|-id=000 bgcolor=#fefefe
| 96000 ||  || — || July 11, 2004 || Socorro || LINEAR || — || align=right | 1.5 km || 
|}

References

External links 
 Discovery Circumstances: Numbered Minor Planets (95001)–(100000) (IAU Minor Planet Center)

0095